= List of museums in and around Copenhagen =

The following is a list of museums in Copenhagen, including all of the Region Hovedstaden (best known in English-speaking countries as the Capital Region of Denmark).

== The list ==
Name	Image	District/place	Municipality	Type	Summary
Amalienborg Museum		Amalienborg Slotsplads 1; 1257 København K	Copenhagen	Art, antiquities, historic site	Located in Amalienborg Palace, the royal palace, displays the Chronological Collections of the Glücksburg monarchs
Amber Museum		Nyhavn	Copenhagen	Design and natural history museum	A combined shop and museum of amber
Arken Museum of Modern Art		Skovvej 100; 2635 Ishøj	Ishøj	Art	A permanent collection of modern art and large changing exhibitions
Assistens Cemetery		Nørrebro	Copenhagen	Art	Historic cemetery, burial place of many famous people, small museum dedicated to the artist Germin Stilling in former stables
Bakkehuset		Rahbæks Allé 23; 1801 Frederiksberg	Frederiksberg	Historic house	A historic house associated with the Danish Golden Age of the early 19th century
Blue Planet Aquarium		Kastrup	Tårnby	Aquarium	Aquarium with 4,000,000 L water
Brede House		Brede	Lyngby-Taarbæk	Historic House	A country house built in 1795 today managed by the National Museum as a historic house museum with interiors typical of its time
Carlsberg Visitor Centre		Carlsberg	Copenhagen Municipality	History	Historic site, interactive experience centre
Charlottenborg		City Centre	Copenhagen Municipality	Art	Located in a historic building, large exhibition space for modern art
Church of Our Saviour		Christianshavn	Copenhagen Municipality	Religious	Lutheran church, access to the corkscrew spire
Cinemateket		City Centre	Copenhagen	Film	National Danish film museum with three auditoriums
The Cisterns		Søndermarken	Frederiksberg	Art	Located in a complex of abandoned, underground cisterns, hosts a permanent and special exhibitions of glass art
Copenhagen City Museum		Vesterbro	Copenhagen	History	Exhibitions about the history of Copenhagen
Copenhagen Zoo		Frederiksberg	Frederiksberg	Science	All-round zoological garden with Elephant House designed by Sir Norman Foster
Danish Architecture Centre		Christianshavn	Copenhagen	Design	Changing exhibitions about architecture and urban planning
Danish Jewish Museum		Slotsholmen	Copenhagen	History	Based at the Royal Danish Library in galleries designed by Daniel Libeskind, documenting Jewish history in Denmark
Danish Maritime Museum		Helsingør	Helsingør	Cultural history	Museum dedicated to the maritime history of Denmark located in an underground museum building designed by Bjarke Ingels Group around a former dry dock
Danish Museum of Science & Technology		Helsingør	Helsingør	Technology	Dedicated to science and technology, focusing on display of machines and technology, old as well as new, including the recently used Soyuz TMA-12M space capsule.
National Gallery of Denmark		City Centre	Copenhagen Municipality	Art	National collection of art from the 14th century to the present day
Danish Police Museum		Nørrebro	Copenhagen Municipality	Cultural history	A former police station from 1883, now a museum dedicated to the history of the Danish Police Fore and crime in Denmark
David Collection		City Centre	Copenhagen	Art, applied arts	Located in two Neo-classical town houses, extensive collection of Islamic Art and Danish and European fine and applied arts
Den Frie Udstillingsbygning		City Centre	Copenhagen	Art	Contemporary art exhibitions
Design Museum Denmark		Frederiksstaden	Copenhagen	Design	Located in the 18th-century Frederick's Hospital, Denmark's national museum for design, both modern and historic
DieselHouse		South Docklands	Copenhagen	Technology	Interactive experience centre with diesel technology as the main theme
Experimentarium		Tuborg Havn	Gentofte	Technology	Located in a former building of the Tuborg Brewery, science centre with interactive exhibitions, changing exhibitions
Finn Juhl House		Klampenborg	Gentofte	Historic house	Operated by Ordrupgaard, modernist house designed by Finn Juul with most of its furniture for his own use
Fotografisk Center		Carlsberg	Copenhagen	Photography	Exhibition space dedicated to Danish and International art photography
Frederiksborg Museum		Hillerød	Hillerød	Art. historic site	Located at Frederiksborg Castle, art collection illustrating Danish history combined with historic interiors
Frederiksholms Kanal 16–18		City Centre	Copenhagen	Historic House	The Victorian Home, a 15-room, late 19th-century bourgeois home is operated as a historic house museum by the National Museum of Denmark
Frieboeshvile		Kongens Lyngby	Lyngby-Taarbæk	Local	A former Rococo country house, now hosting the local historic collections for Lyngby-Taarbæk municipality
Gammel Holtegård		Holte	Rudersdal	Art	Located in a former country house designed by architect Lauritz de Thurah for his own use, changing art exhibitions
Heerup Museum		Rødovre	Rødovre	Art museum	Biographical museum dedicated to the oeuvre of the artist Henry Heerup
Hirschsprung Collection		Stockholmsgade 20; 2100 København Ø	Copenhagen	Art	Large collection of Danish 19th- and early 20th-century art with some provenance furniture
Nivaagaard		Nivå	Fredensborg	Art	Permanent painting collection and changing exhibitions
J.F. Willumsens Museum		Frederikssund	Frederikssund	Art	Dedicated to the works of the artist Jens Ferdinand Willumsen
HDMS Peder Skram		Holmen	Copenhagen	Ship	A decommissioned frigate of the Royal Danish Navy, now open to the public
HDMS Sehested		Holmen	Copenhagen	Ship	The last fast attack boat in the Royal Danish Navy
HDMS Sælen		Holmen	Copenhagen	Ship	A decommissioned submarine of the Royal Danish Navy, now open to the public
Jægerspris Castle		Jægerspris	Frederikssund	Historic house	Museum in Baroque manor house and former royal residence associated with King Frederick VII and Countess Danner, sculpture park
Karen Blixen Museum		Rungsted	Hørsholm	Biographical, historic house	Former family home of author Karen Blixen, also exhibiting a collection of her paintings and drawings
Kastrupgård		Kastrup	Tårnby	Art, applied arts, historic site	Permanent and changing art exhibitions, a collection of artefacts from Kastrup Værk
Kronborg Castle		Helsingør	Helsingør	Historic site	Historic interiors and artefacts as well as changing exhibitions
Kroppedal		Taastrup	Høje-Taastrup	Astronomy, archaeology, ethnology	National museum of Danish astronomy, also has an archaeological unit, and an ethnological unit specializing in modern society
Kunstforeningen		City Centre	Copenhagen	Art	Based in a Rococo town house, changing exhibitions of Danish and International art, mainly contemporary but occasionally historical
Lightvessel Gedser Rev		Nyhavn	Copenhagen Municipality	Ship	Defunct lightvessel, now opened to the public
Little Mill		Christianshavn	Copenhagen Municipality	Historic house	Operated by National Museum, originally a windmill but transformed into a private home in 1917, intact, interiors
Louisiana Museum of Modern Art		Gl. Strandvej 13; 3050 Humlebæk	Fredensborg-Humlebæk	Art	Denmark's most visited museum, large permanent and changing exhibitions and sculpture garden
Marienlyst Castle		Helsingør	Helsingør Municipality	Historic house	Palacial residence which formerly served as a royal pavilion of Kronborg Castle
Medical Museion		City Centre	Copenhagen	History	History of medicine
Munkeruphus		Dronningmølle	Gribskov	Art	A Colonial Revival-style former country house now playing host to changing exhibitions of art, crafrs, design and architecture
Museum of Hunting and Forestry		Hørsholm	Hørsholm	History	History of hunting and forestry
Museum of Music		City Centre	Copenhagen	Cultural history	History of Music
National Museum of Denmark		City Centre	Copenhagen	History, archeology, ethnology	National collections of archeological finds and historic objects. Ethnological exhibits.
National Museum of Photography		City Centre	Copenhagen Municipality	Photography	National Danish collections of photographs, changing exhibitions
Natural History Museum of Denmark		City Centre	Copenhagen Municipality	Nature	Includes the Zoological Museum, Geological Museum, Botanical Museum and Central Library, and Botanical Gardens
North Atlantic House		City Centre	Copenhagen Municipality	Art, culture	Cultural history of Greenland, Iceland, Faroe Islands
Ny Carlsberg Glyptotek		City Centre	Copenhagen Municipality	Art	Significant collections of classical antiquities, Danish and European 19th- and 20th-century art, French impressionism particularly well represented
Nyboder Memorial Rooms		City Centre	Copenhagen Municipality	Art	Exhibition about everyday life in the Nyboder naval quarters from 1631 to the present day
Open Air Museum		Kongens Lyngby	Lyngby-Taarbæk	Historic	A collection of more than a hundred rural buildings from around Denmark as well as reconstructed period gardens and old Danish breeds of farm animal
Ordrupgaard		Ordrup	Gentofte	Art	Located in a historic in a former country house with an extension by Zaha Hadid, exhibits a significant collection of Danish and French art from the 19th and early 20th century as well as changing exhibitions
Post & Tele Museum		City Centre	Copenhagen	History	Postal and telecommunications history, stamps, letters, artefacts
Resistance Museum		City Centre	Copenhagen	History	Exhibition about the Danish resistance movement during World War II
Danish Revue Museum		Frederiksberg	Frederiksberg	Cultural history	Museum dedicated to Danish revue, based in a former country house from the late 19th century
Rosenborg Museum		City Centre	Copenhagen	Art, antiquities, historic building	A Renaissance castle built by King Christian IV, displays the Chronological Collections of the Danish Oldenburg monarchs, including the Danish Crown Regalia
Roskilde Cathedral		Roskilde	Roskilde	Religious	Lutheran cathedral, exhibition about its history with artefacts, models and reconstructions
Round Tower		City Centre	Copenhagen	Art, historic site	A 17th-century observatory, changing art and other exhibitions in the attached Library Hall located above Trinity Church
Royal Danish Arsenal Museum		Slotsholmen	Copenhagen	Military	Collections of historic weapons and military artefacts
Royal Cast Collection		City Centre	Copenhagen	Art	Located in an 18th-century former warehouse of the Danish West India Company, comprises more than 2,000 plaster casts of sculptures and reliefs from around the world
Royal Danish Naval Museum		Christianshavn	Copenhagen	Military	History and artefacts of the Royal Danish Navy
Royal Life Guards Museum		City Centre	Copenhagen	Art	Located in Rosenborg Barracks, history and artefacts of the Royal Life Guards from 1658 to the present day
Royal Stables and Carriage Museum		Slotsholmen	Copenhagen	History	The Danish royal family's stables and collection of carriages at Christiansborg Palace
Rudolph Tegner Museum		Dronningmølle	Gribskov	Art	Purpose-built museum for works by sculptor Rudolph Tegner, located in an area of protected heatherlands
St. Ansgar's Museum		Frederiksstaden	Copenhagen	Religious	Located in connection with St. Ansgar's, the Catholic cathedral in Copenhagen, sizable collection of artefacts linked with the church and the Catholic congregation, and Liturgic artefacts
Storm P Museum		Frederiksberg	Frederiksberg	Biographical	History of Danish cartoonist, writer, animator, illustrator, painter actor and humorist Robert Storm Petersen and collections of his works
Theatre Museum in the Court Theatre		Slotsholmen	Copenhagen	Theatre Museum	The museum seeks to document the history of professional theater through collections of pictures, letters, costumes, props and models of theater buildings and set designs.
Thorvaldsens Museum		Slotsholmen	Copenhagen	Art, biographical	Purpose-built museum dedicated to the works and collections which Bertel Thorvaldsen brought back from Rome
Tycho Brahe Planetarium		Vesterbro	Copenhagen	Planetarium	Exhibitions about astronomy, an IMAX theatre and a star projector
University Botanical Garden		City Centre	Copenhagen	Natural history	27 glasshouses and more than 13,000 species of plants
V1 Gallery		Vesterbro	Copenhagen	Art	Contemporary art gallery
Viking Ship Museum		Roskilde	Roskilde	Maritime, history	Display of recovered remains of Viking ships
Worker's Museum		City Centre	Copenhagen	History	History and artefacts relating to workers in Copenhagen
Æbelholt Abbey Museum		Hillerød	Hillerød	Antiquities, historic site	Displays the remains of an Augustinian monastery
Øregård Museum		Hellerup	Gentofte	Art, history, historic house	Located in a Neoclassical former country house, holds a collection of around 3,000 pictures from the Copenhagen and hosts changing art and historic exhibitions

== Visitor numbers ==
Visit Denmark, the national Danish tourist organisation, publishes an annual Attractions List with visitor figures for the fifty most visited attractions in Denmark. According to that, visitor numbers in 2010 for the most visited museums in and around Copenhagen were:

- Copenhagen Zoo, 1,055,593
- Louisiana Museum of Modern Art, 557,803
- Danish National Gallery, 448,342
- National Museum of Denmark, 434,000
- Round Tower, 391,108
- Ny Carlsberg Glyptotek, 355,945
- Open Air Museum, 318,667
- Experimentarium, 285,755
- Rosenborg Castle, 238,278
- Kronborg Castle, 194,704
- Tycho Brahe Planetarium, 179,800
- Carlsberg Visitor Centre, 157,500
- Post & Tele Museum, 152.879
- National Aquarium Denmark, 132,433
- The Cinemateque, 116,992
- Viking Ship Museum, 111,455
- Worker's Museum, 100,883

Note: The list from Visit Denmark does not include museum-like parks such as Copenhagen Botanical Garden or Assistens Cemetery.

== See also ==
- List of museums in Denmark
- List of tourist attractions in Denmark
