= Scanport =

Mixed use development in Amager, Denmark

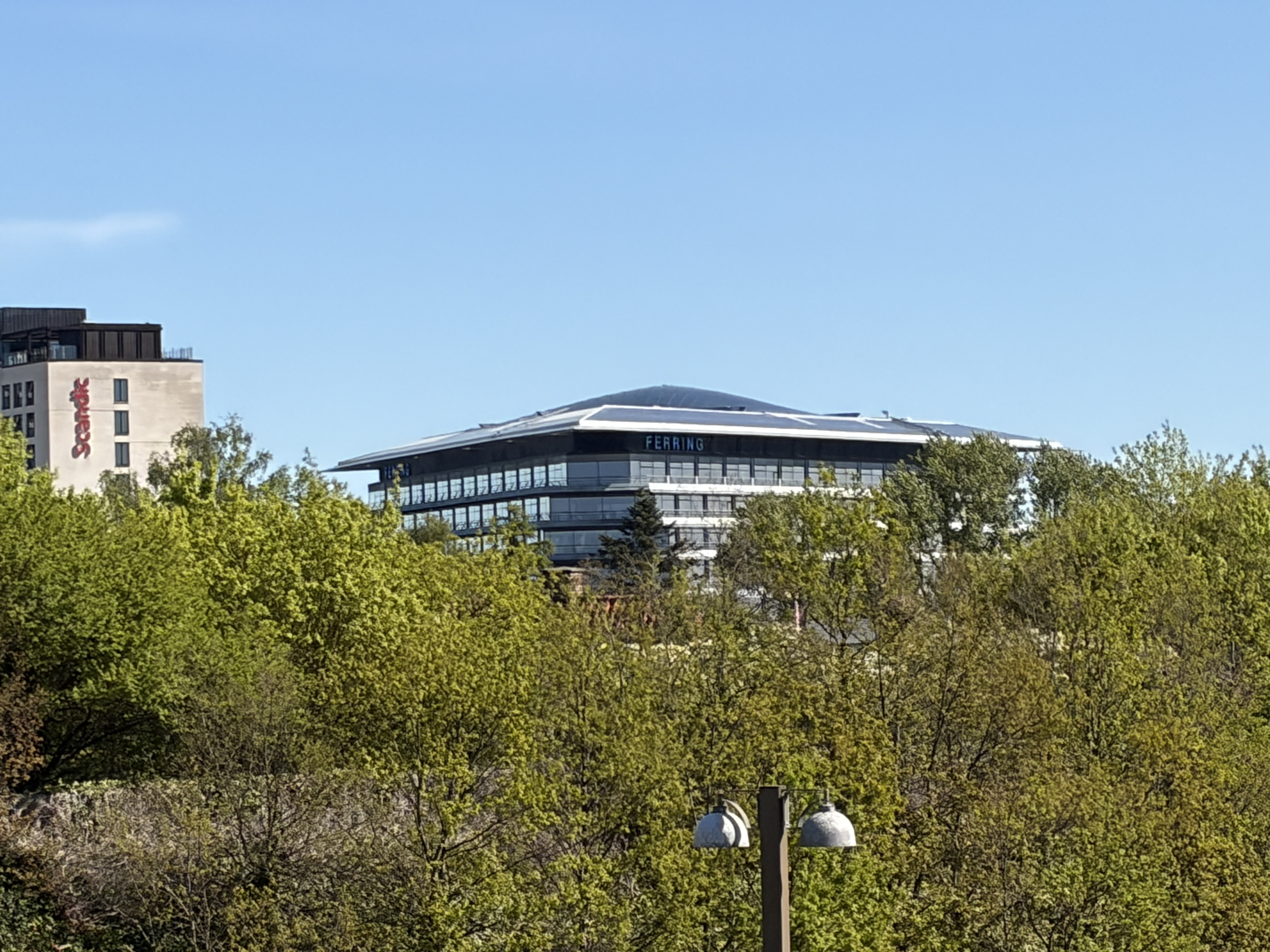
Ferring Pharmaceutical's Denmark headquarters in Scanport

Scanport is a mixed use development on the east coast of Amager, just north of Copenhagen Airport, in Copenhagen, Denmark.

== Redevelopment ==
The area, including the small Kastrup Harbour, originally belonged to Kastrup Værk, a porcelain factory and chalk works established by Jacob Fortling in 1742. It was acquired by Skanska Oresund in 1997 and a masterplan for its redevelopment was created by Schmidt hammer lassen. Construction of the first buildings began in 2007.

In 2011, Astellas Pharma and Scandinavian Business Seating established in the area. In June 2013, it was announced that Ferring Pharmaceuticals would relocate its Danish headquarters as well as its global R&D and registration activities to a new building in the area. It will have an area of 30,000 square metres and is expected to be inaugurated in 2016.

== Marina ==
As part of the project, Kastrup Harbour changed its name to Scanport Marina. It will have a water depth of at least 4.5 m.
