= Kastrup =

Suburb of Copenhagen, Denmark

Coordinates: 55°38′15″N 12°38′30″E

Kastrup (Danish: [ˈkʰæˌstʁɔp]) is a suburb of Copenhagen, Denmark, on the east coast of Amager in Tårnby Municipality. It is the site of Copenhagen Airport. In Danish, the airport is often called Kastrup Lufthavn (Kastrup Airport) or Københavns Lufthavn, Kastrup (Copenhagen Airport, Kastrup).

== History ==
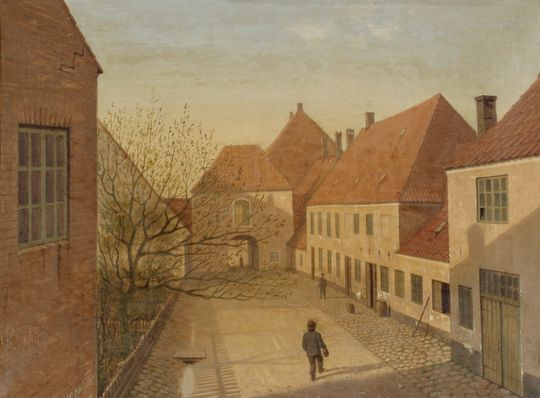
Kastrup Works

In 1749 Jacob Fortling obtained a royal license to establish a lime plant in Kastrup. It harbor in Kastrup for the landing of chalk from Saltholm. He soon diversified with a brickyard (1752) and a pottery specializing in faience (1755) at the same site. This marked the beginning of an industrial development that accelerated after the opening of Kastrup Glassworks in 1847. Copenhagen Airport opened in 1925.

== Landmarks ==
Local landmarks include the -

- National Aquarium, public aquarium
- Kastrup Værk, pottery and tile works
- Kastrupgård, a former manor house
- Kastrup Church
- Travbaneparken, a public park (formerly the Amager speedway stadium)

== Notable people ==
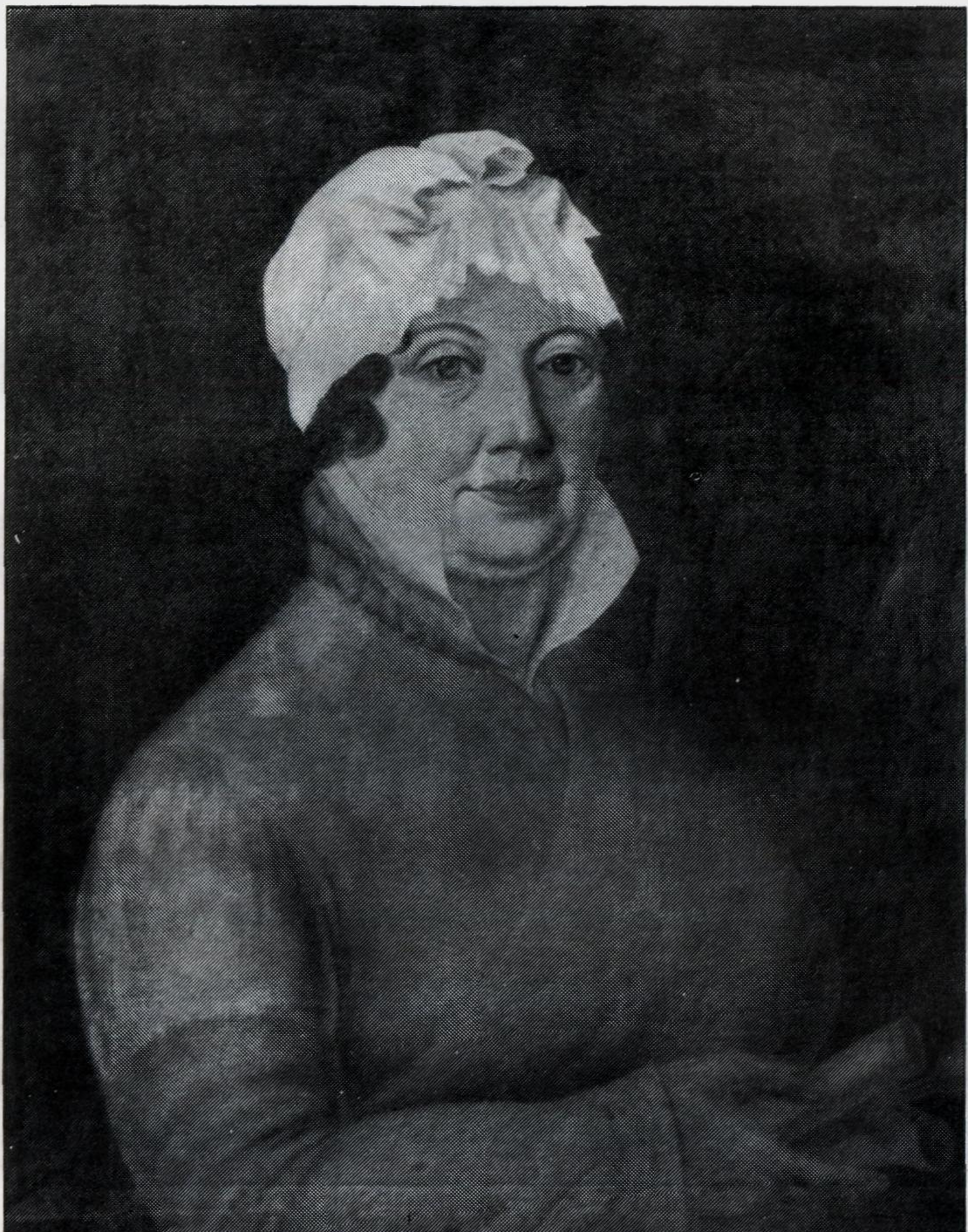
Christiane Koren

- Christiane Koren (1764–1815) a Danish-Norwegian writer, wrote poems, plays and diaries,

== Sport ==
- Malene Franzen (born 1970) a Danish rhythmic gymnast, competed at the 1988 Summer Olympics
- Dorthe Holm (born 1972) a Danish curler, skipped the Danish women's team at the 2006 Winter Olympics
- Jacob Carstensen (born 1978) a former freestyle swimmer, competed in three consequentive Summer Olympics
- Michael Falkesgaard (born 1991) a Danish-Filipino Professional Footballer
- Amalie Dideriksen (born 1996) a Danish road and track cyclist
- Lukas Engel (born 1998) a Danish Professional Footballer
- Karolina Jensen (born 2003) a Danish curler

=== Speedway ===
A motorcycle speedway stadium existed in the modern day site of the Travbaneparken. It opened on 4 September 1952 and closed on 27 June 1963. Although it only existed for eleven years, it hosted significant events including a qualifying round of the Speedway World Championship in 1955 and the Danish Speedway Championship in 1953, 1955 and 1958.

== Companies ==
Scandinavian Airlines has its Denmark offices and the SAS Cargo head office in Kastrup. Transavia Denmark has its head office in Kastrup.

When SAS Commuter operated, its head office was in Kastrup. When Danair existed, its head office was in Kastrup.

== Transport ==
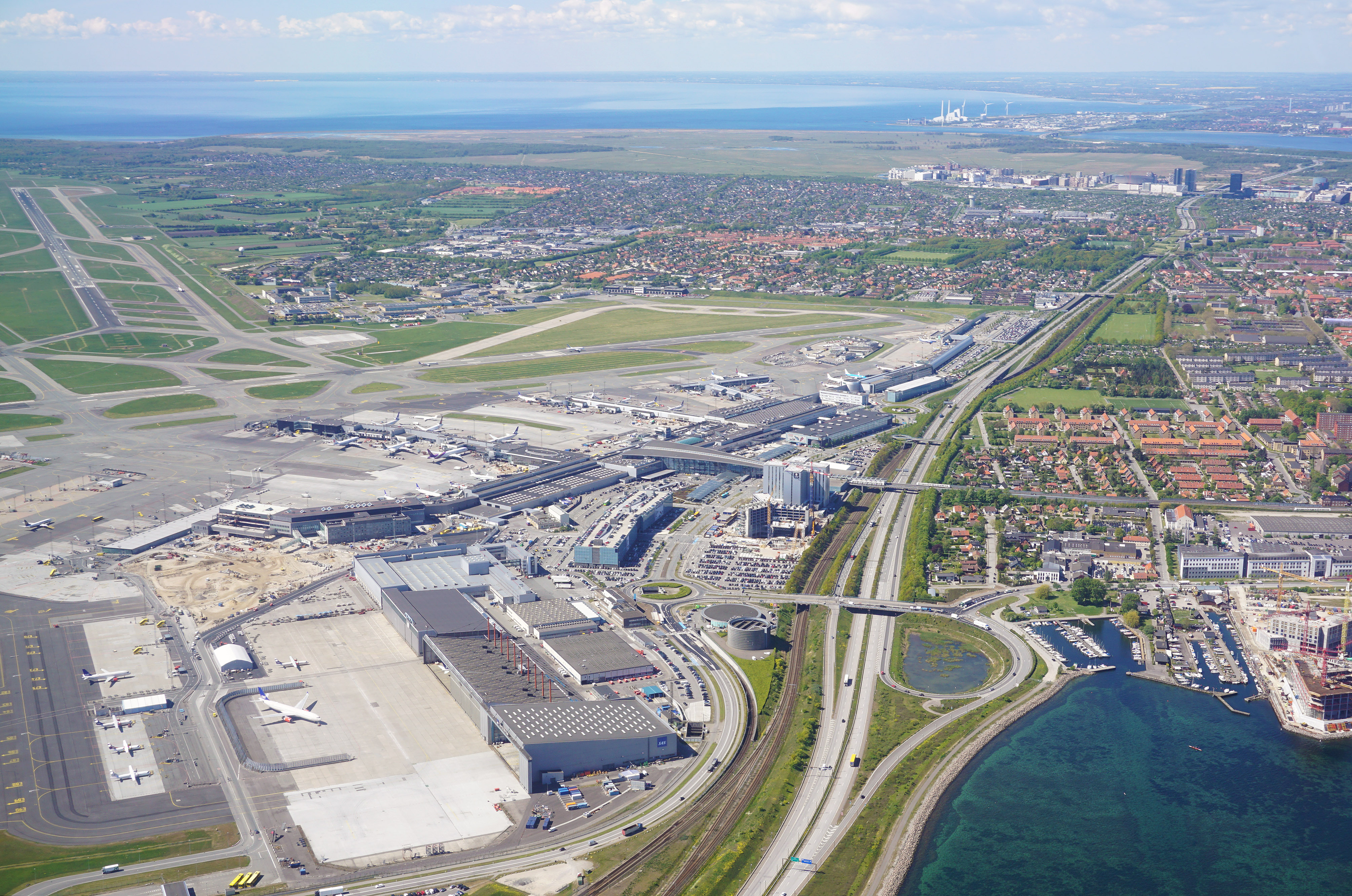
Aerial view of the airport.

Kastrup Station serves the M2 line of the Copenhagen Metro. Lufthavnen Station is the terminus of the line. Trains approach the station by a bridge over the Øresund Motorway (E20). The platform area is constructed above the Øresund Railway adjoining a multi-storey car park. The station connects to the airport at the north end of Terminal 3 on level 2. Intercity trains operate out of the mainline Copenhagen Airport railway station which is located beneath the airport terminal building. There are several buses that roam through the city of Kastrup, following bus-lines: 2A, 5A and 36.

== Cultural references ==
The former Superfos A/S-Glasuldsfabrik mineral wool factory (now Vægterparken) between Nordmarksvej and Bøllevej, which closed in 1982, is used as a location at 1:26:08 in the 1977 Olsen-banden film The Olsen Gang Outta Sight.
