= Stormgade =

Street in Copenhagen, Denmark

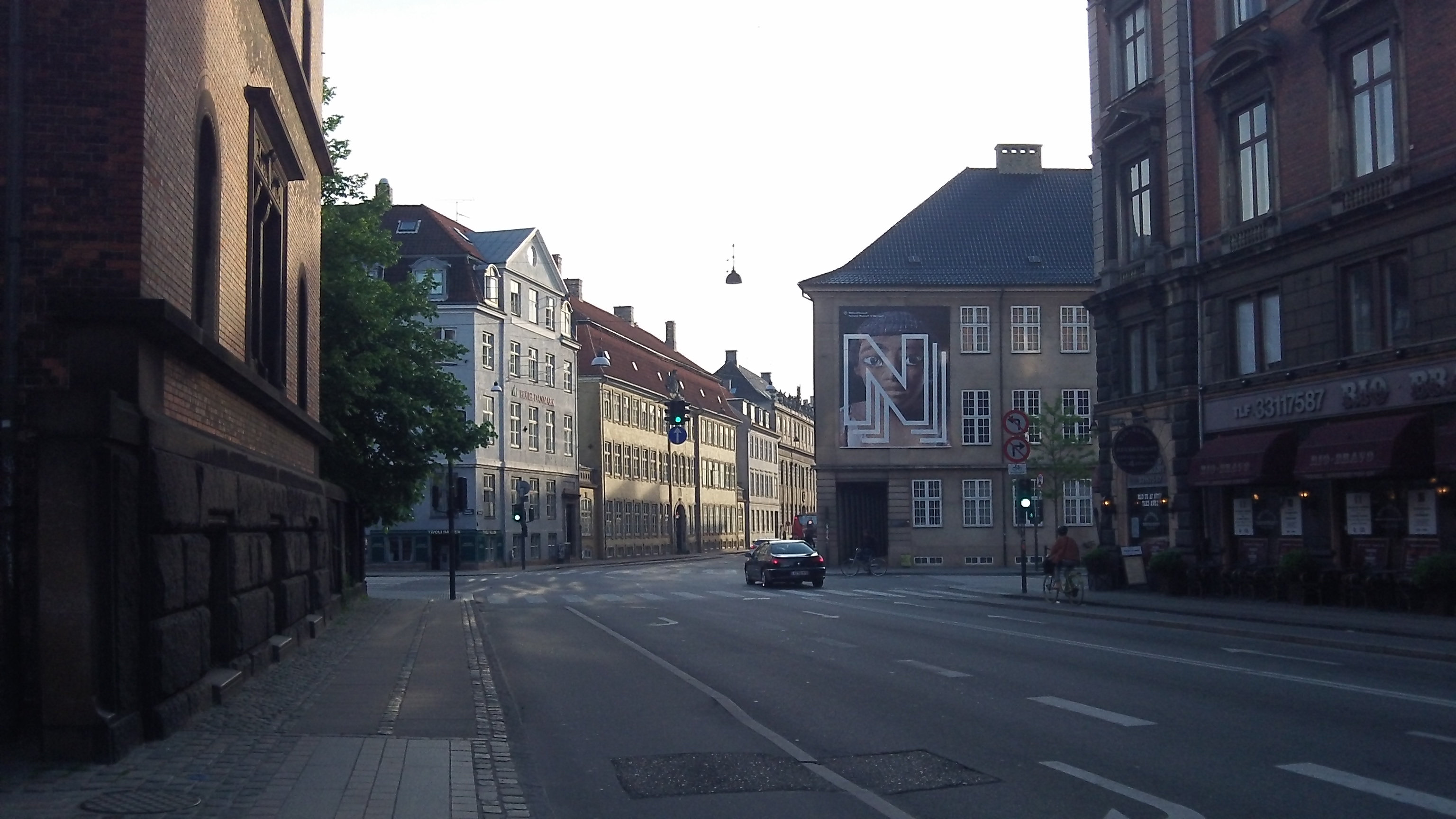
- Stormgade at the intersection with Vester Voldgade
- Length: 300 m (980 ft)
- Location: Copenhagen, Denmark
- Quarter: Frederiksholm Quarter
- Postal code: 1470, 1663
- Nearest metro station: Gammel Strand
- Coordinates: 55°40′28.78″N 12°34′24.67″E
- Northeast end: Frederiksholms Kanal
- Southwest end: Vester Voldgade

Stormgade (lit. "Storm Street") is a street in central Copenhagen, Denmark. It runs from Frederiksholm Canal to H. C. Andersens Boulevard where it turns into Tietgensgade before continuing along the rear side of Tivoli Gardens and Copenhagen Central Station. In the opposite direction, Storm Bridge connects it to Slotsholmen where traffic may continue across Holmen's Bridge to Holmens Kanal, part of Ring 2, or across Knippel's Bridge to Christianshavn and Amager. The name of the street refers to the Swedish Storm of Copenhagen in 1659.

== History ==
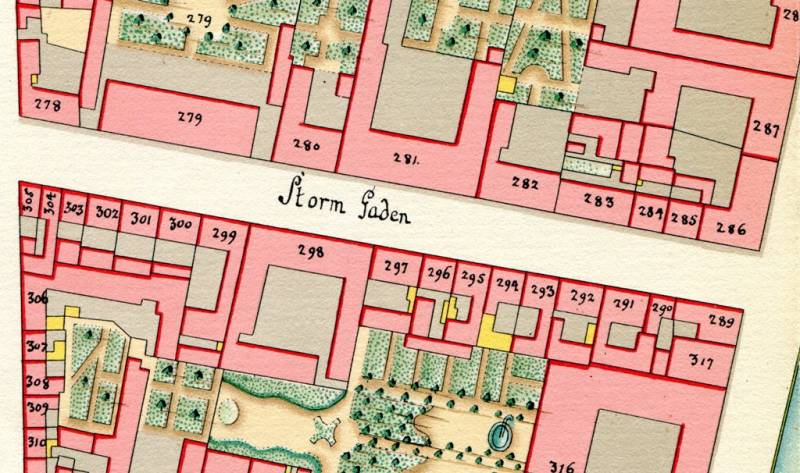
Stormgade as seen on Gedde's map from 1757

The area south of Slotsholmen was originally part of the shallow-watered area known as Kalveboderne. The coast line ran approximately where Stormgade runs today. On the night of 10 February 1658, Swedish troops made an assault on Slotsholmen across the ice. After the attack, it was decided to improve the defense of Slotsholmen by extending Copenhagen's Western Rampart into the water. The area between the rampart and the new Frederiksholm Canal was reclaimed and developed into a small new neighbourhood with three short streets: Slotsholmen, Ny Vestergade and Ny Kongensgade.

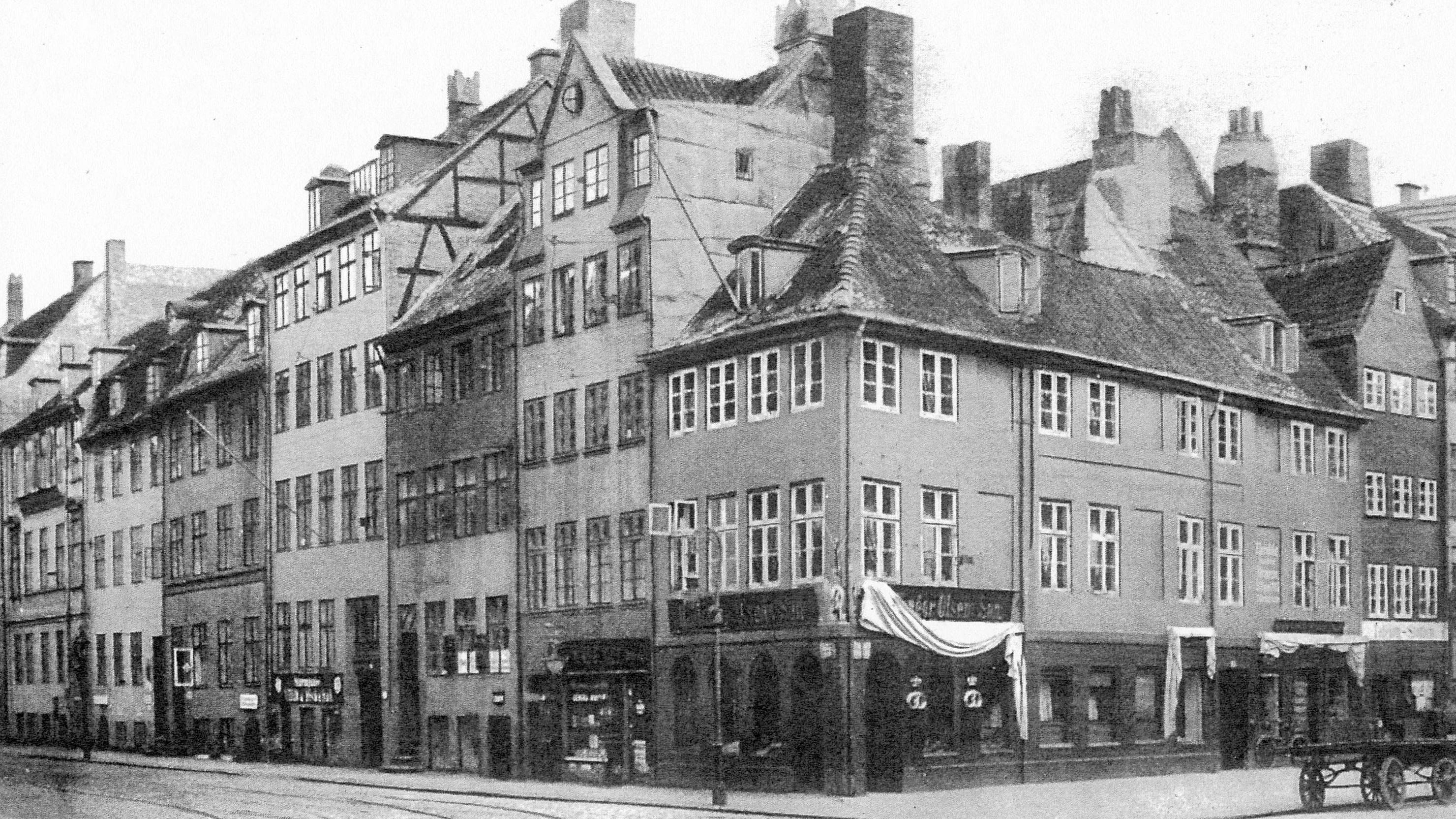
The house row that was demolished in 1931 to create room for the expansion of National Museum

When the Western Rampart was removed in the late 1870s, Stomgade was extended by one block to Vestre Boulevard (now H. C. Andersens Boulevard).

The entire southeast side of the street was demolished in 1931 to make way for an expansion of the National Museum. One of the buildings had stood from 1783 until 1923.

== Notable buildings and residents ==
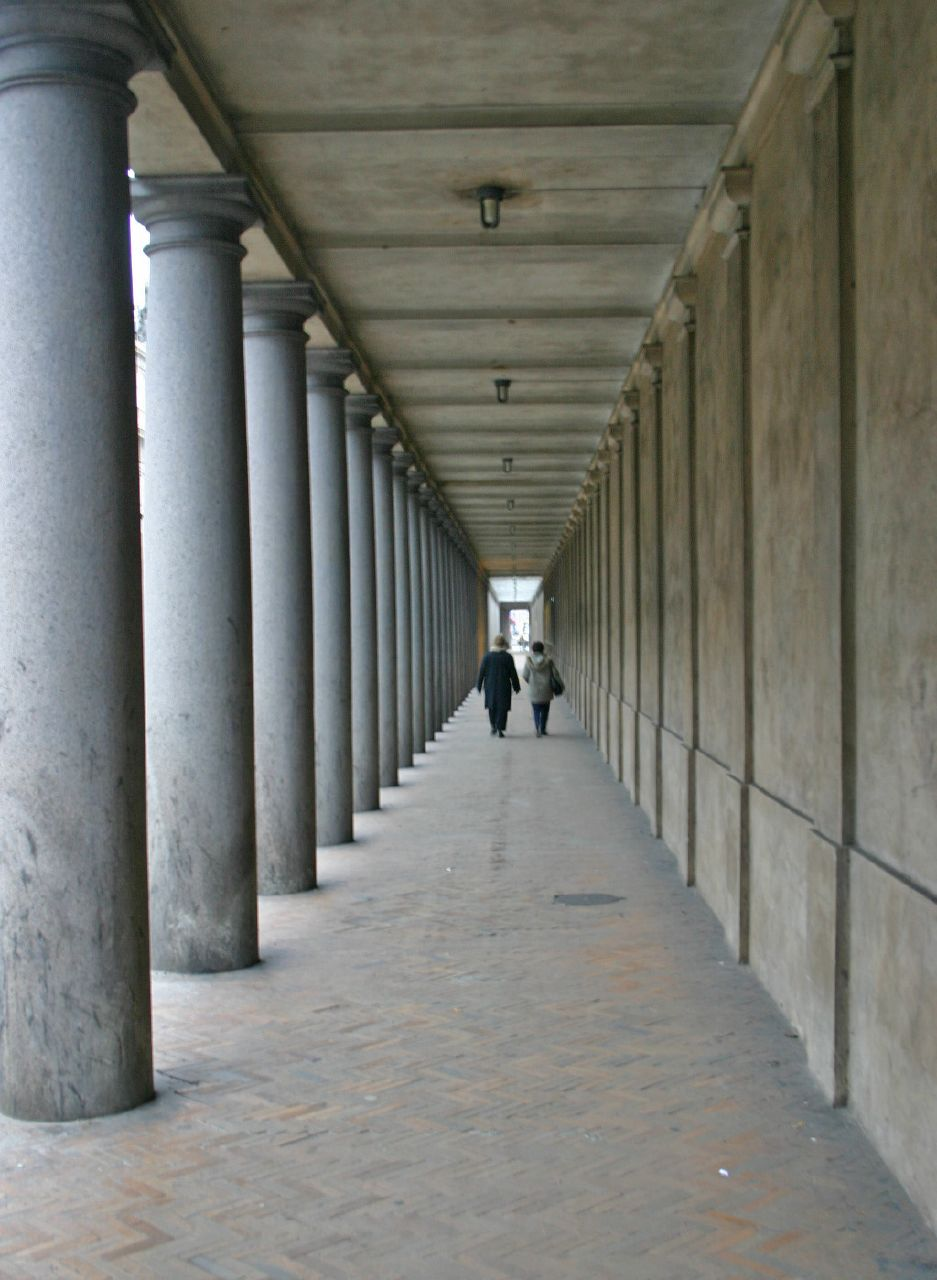
The National Museum's colonnade

The National Museum's façade on Stomgade dates from 1929 to 1938. Its most distinctive feature is the colonnade with 38 columns in Bornholmian granite which runs along the full length of the building.

No. 6 is from 1851 and was listed in 1918. No. 8 was originally two separate buildings dating from some time before 1734, which were merged into one in 1748.

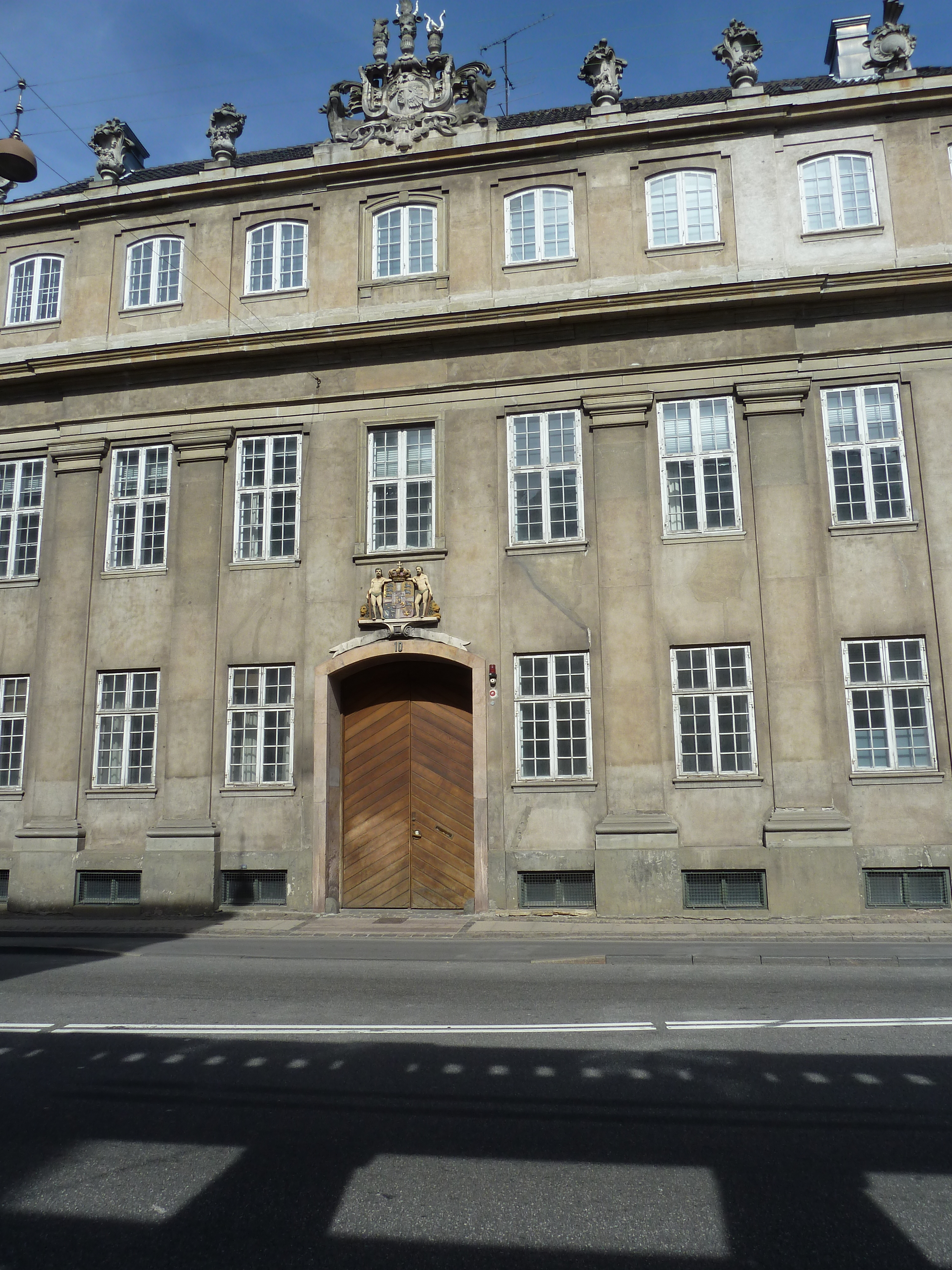
The Holstein Mansion

The Holstein Mansion was originally built in 1687 but owes its current appearance mainly to an expansion carried out by Jacob Fortling in 1756. It was home to the Natural History Museum between 1827 and 1871.

Det Harboeske Enkefruekloster (No. 14) was rebuilt by Elias David Häusser in 1741 but owes its current appearance to expansions and alterations carried out by Lauritz de Thurah between 1754 and 1760.

The corner building at No. 16 was built for royal pastry-maker Jens Raae in 1791. The dormer window on Stormgade was added in 1811 and the building has undergone several alterations since then. It was listed in 1945.

The corner building at No. 18, on the other side of Vester Voldgade, was originally built for Overformynderiet, a financial institution that later moved to a new building in Holmens Kanal. The building was designed by Hans Jørgen Holm and is from 1894. In 2014, it was decided to convert it, together with parts of the neighbouring building at No. 20, into a new home for the Museum of Copenhagen.
