= Kastrupgård =

Manor house in Kastrup, Copenhagen, Denmark

Coordinates: 55.6346°N 12.6383°E

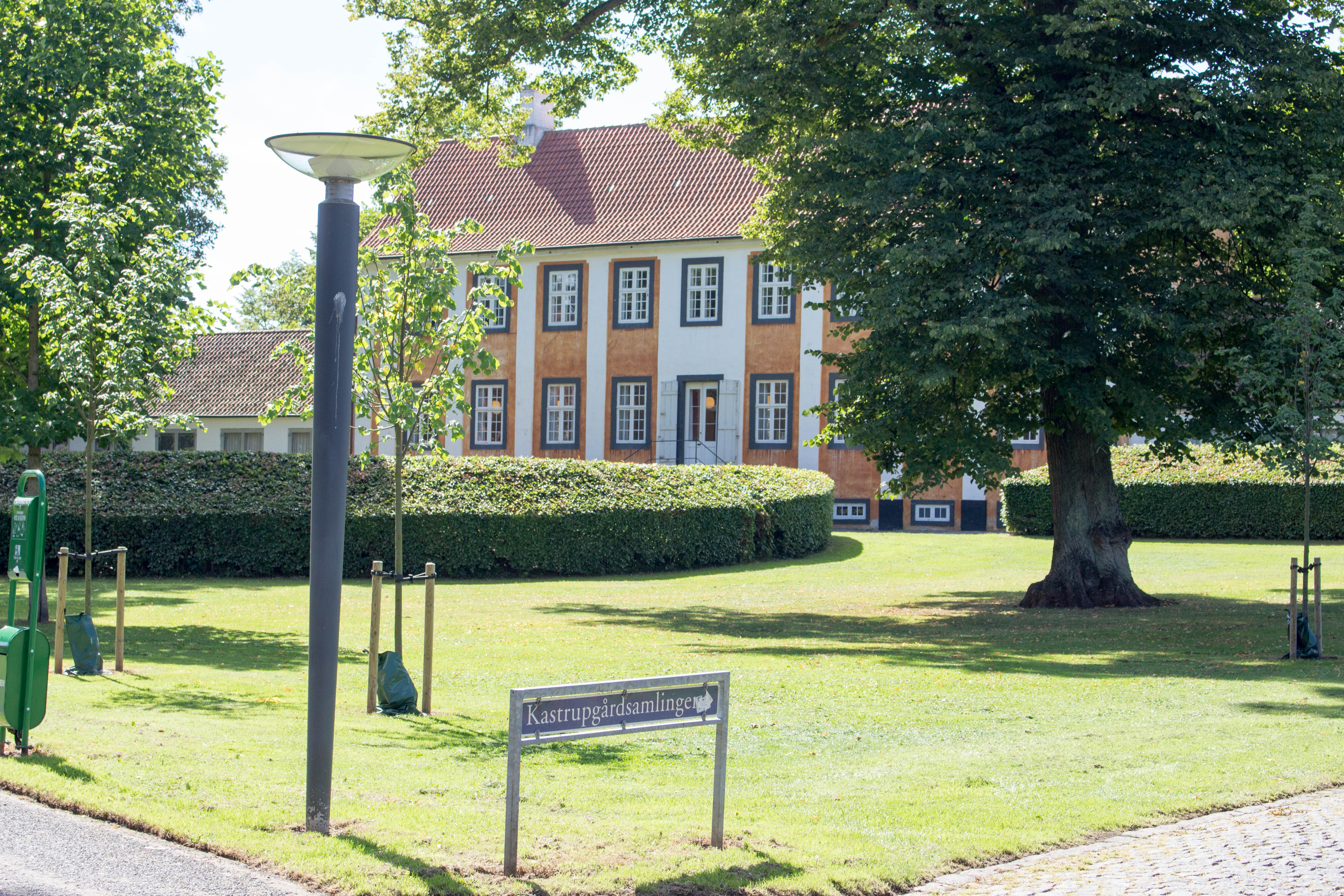
Kastrupgård viewed from the park

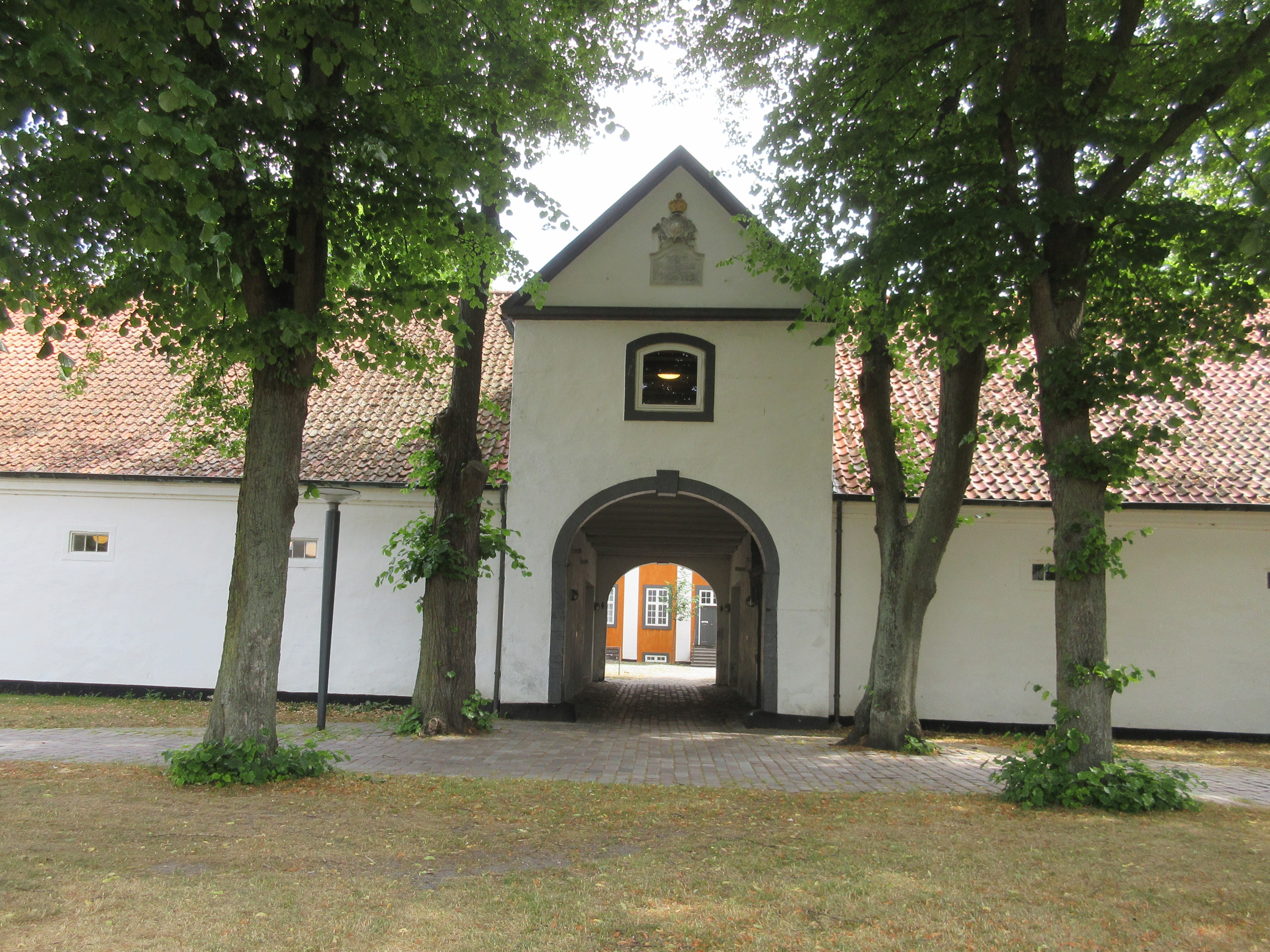
Kastrupgård gatehouse

Kastrupgård is a former manor house in Kastrup, a suburb of Copenhagen, Denmark. Dating from the mid 18th century, it is now a museum housing the Kastrupgård Collection (Kastrupgårdsamlingen) of modern art, which is owned and operated by Tårnby Municipality.

== History and architecture ==
Kastrupgård was designed in rococo style by sculptor and architect Jacob Fortling (1711–1761) for his own use. It was built between 1749 and 1753. Fortling came to Denmark from Germany and became royal master builder and sculptor to the Danish royal court. He also founded the nearby Kastrup Pottery and Tile Works (Kastrup Værk).

== Collections ==
Tårnby municipality decided in 1968 to convert Kastrupgård into a museum and establish an art collection. After the restoration of Kastrupgård, the collection opened as a museum in 1977. In 1983, the south side wing was moved into a new exhibition hall and in 1988 two halls in the main building were arranged for exhibitions and a café. In 2013, the municipality of Tårnby was in charge of extensive refurbishment and redevelopment, so that there is now a museum in all the four wings of the site. Support was provided by Realdania, a private association in Denmark which supports projects in architecture and planning.

The museum contains a collection of modern art which has been acquired gradually by Tårnby Municipality since 1970. The emphasis is on graphic arts. It is also home to a collection of works by painter Theodor Philipsen (1840–1920) and of faiences from Kastrup Værk.

== See also ==
- List of museums in and around Copenhagen
