= Holstein Mansion =

Town mansion in Copenhagen, Denmark

- Holsteins Palæ
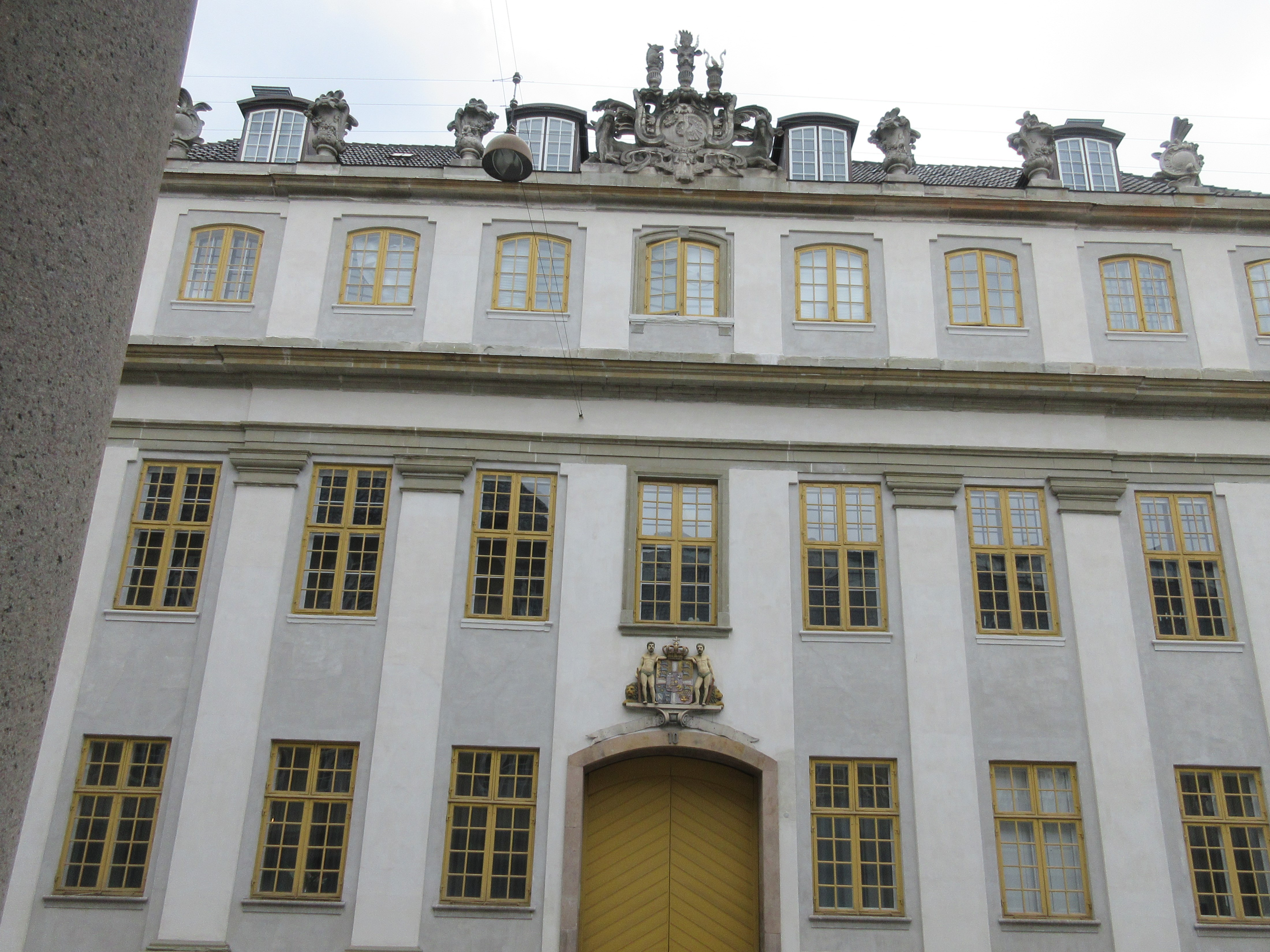
- Interactive map of the Holstein Mansion area

General information
- Location: Copenhagen, Denmark
- Coordinates: 55°40′30.36″N 12°34′27.48″E
- Completed: 18th century
- Client: Hinrich Ladiges

The Holstein Mansion is a Baroque style town mansion on Stormgade in central Copenhagen, Denmark. The history of the property dates back to the late 17th century but the name and current design of the building is from the 1750s when it was owned by the Holstein family and expanded by royal sculptor Jacob Fortling. Once home to the Natural History Museum, it housed government offices until 2015. Today it has been completely renovated and converted into private apartments.

== History ==
=== Early history ===
The original house was built for Hofmarschall Henrik Ulrik Lützow in 1687. The two-storey, nine-bay house was possibly designed by General Building Master Lambert van Haven. Lützow's property was listed in Copenhagen's first cadastre of 1689 as No. 261 in the city's West Quarter (Vester Kvarter).

In 1706, the house was expanded with a wide bay at both ends of the main wing and two perpendicular wings to the rear. The architect of this expansion was possibly Johan Conrad Ernst.

=== Holstein family ===
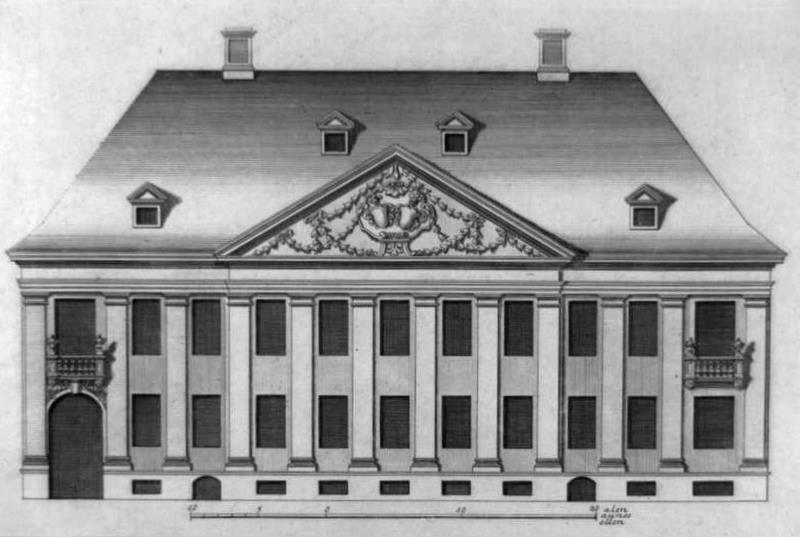
Illustration from Lauritz de Thurah's Hafnia Hodierna showing the Holstein Mansion as it appeared prior to the expansion in 1756.

In 1726, Privy Councillor Johan Georg Holstein purchased the mansion. It was after his death in 1739 passed on to his son Johan Ludvig Holstein. In 1739, he also acquired the Ledreborg estate near Roskilde. He kept the town mansion in Stormgade as his winter residence. The property was in the new cadastre of 1756 listed as No. 281.

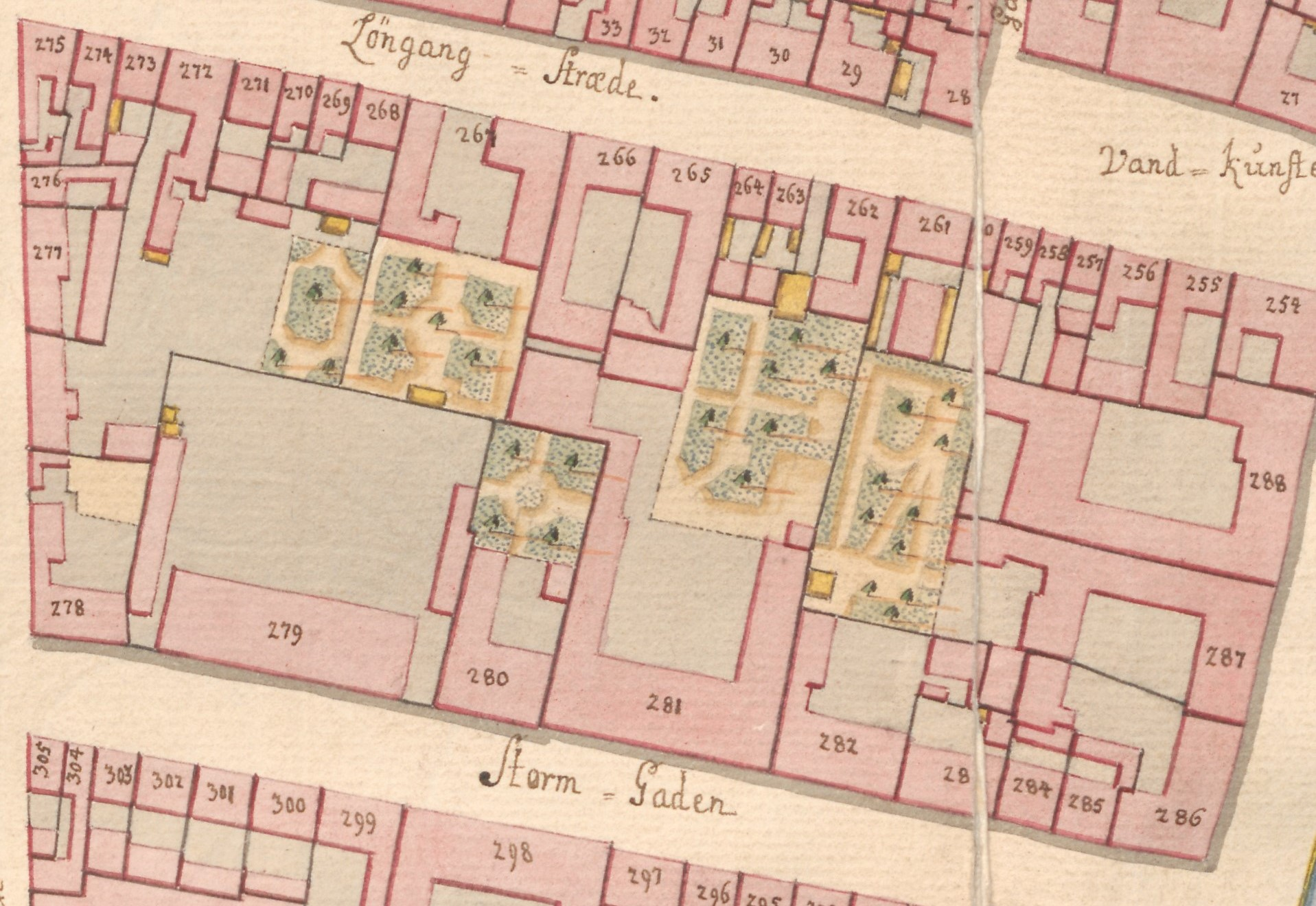
No. 281 seen on a detail from Christian Gedde's map of Copenhagen's West Quarter, 1757.

The mansion was after Johan Ludvig Holstein's death in 1763 passed on to his son Christian Frederik Holstein. In 1767, he commissioned court sculptor Jacob Fortling to carry out another expansion of the Holstein Mansion.

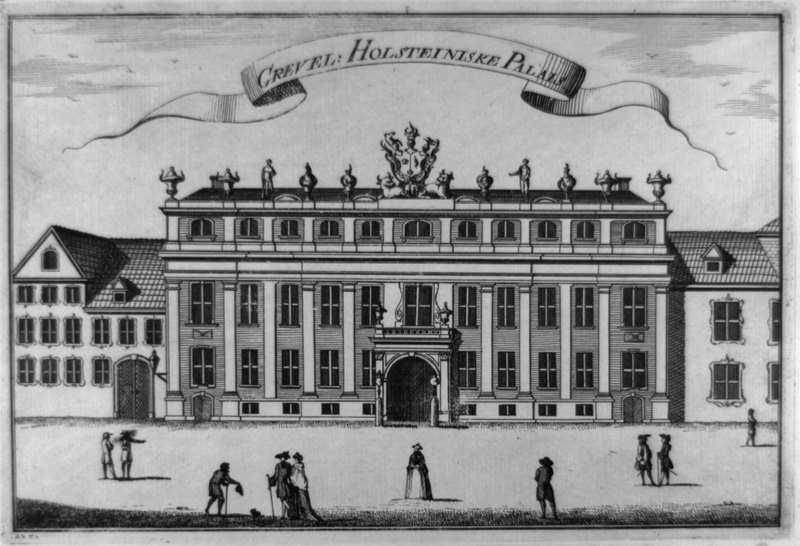
After the expansion

The property was after Christian Frederik Holstein's death in 1799 passed on to his son Christian Edzard Holstein-Ledreborg. His property in Stormgade was listed in the new cadastre of 1806 as No. 187.

=== changing ownersm 1807–1827 ===
The house remained in the hands of the Holstein family until it was acquired by Supreme Court Justice Christian Colbjørnsen in 1807.

In 1810, Colbjørnsen sold the property to Amond Ammondsen. Ammondsen, a ship captain who had made a fortune on the China trade, was active on Copenhagen's turbulent property market during the economic crisis that followed the British bombardments of 1801 and 1807. On 7 January 1810, he had sold the smaller property Vandkunsten 8 after owning it for less than a year. In 1811, he sold the Holstein Mansion to Bille Schack. Later the same year, Bille Schack sold it to Christian Cornelius Lerche of Lerchenborg. Lerche had recently retired from his position as prefect of Holbæk County. In 1818, he was created a count.

=== Royal Museum of Natural History ===
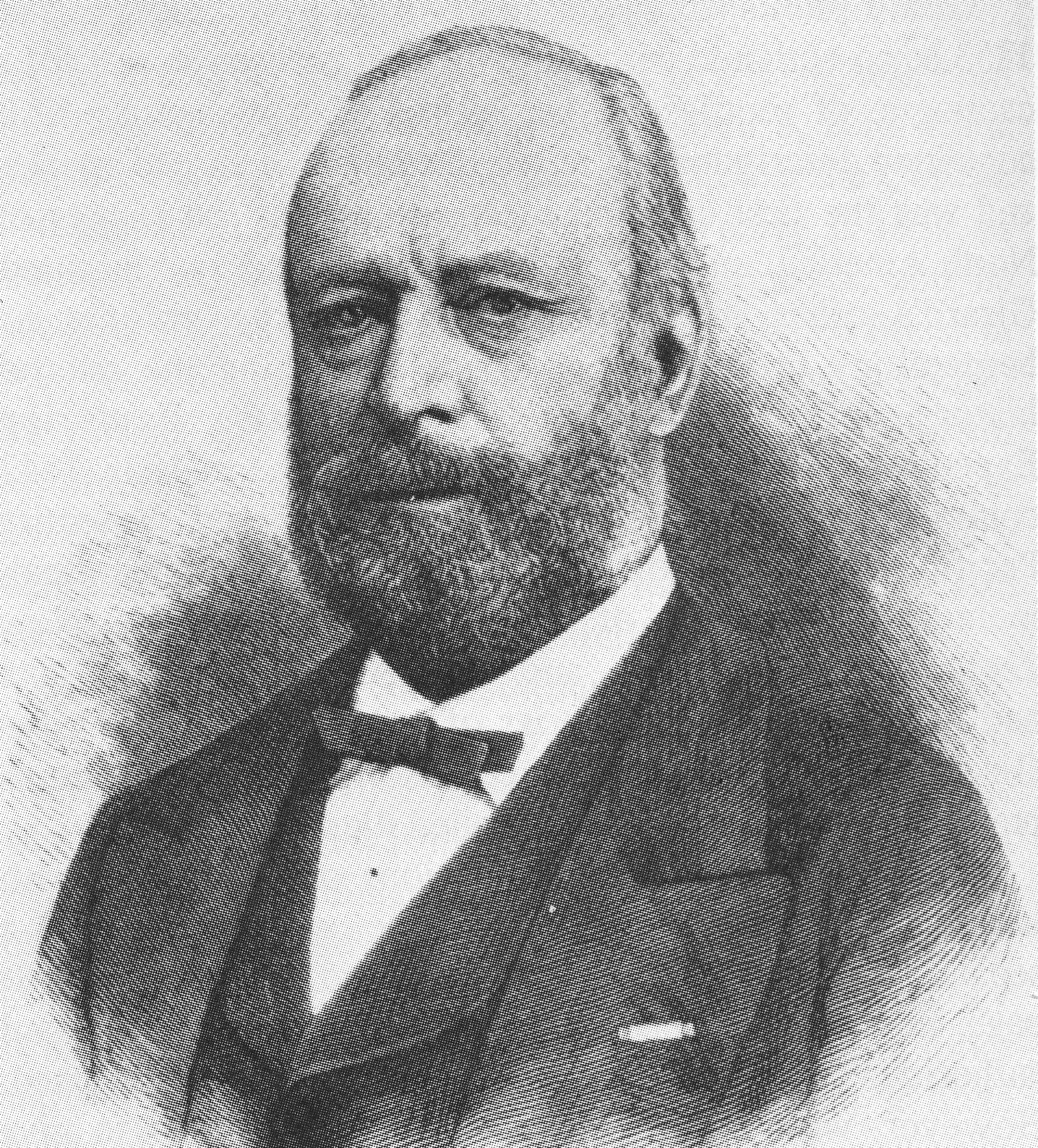
Johannes Theodor Reinhardt

The Holstein Mansion was acquired by the Crown in 1928. It was originally subsequently refurbished under supervision of Jørgen Hansen Koch. It was supposed to serve as a residence for Princess Caroline and Prince Ferdinand after their marriage. It was instead put into use as premises for the new Royal Museum of Natural History.

The naturalist Peter Wilhelm Lund was associated with the museum. He made several journeys to South America and is particularly known for his examinations of limestone caves in Brazil. The zoologist Johannes Theodor Reinhardt was appointed inspector of the Royal Museum of Natural History's 1st Department (mammals and birds) in 1848. He had previously participated in the Galathea Expedition 1845-47 and visited Lund in Brazil in 1848.

=== Later history ===
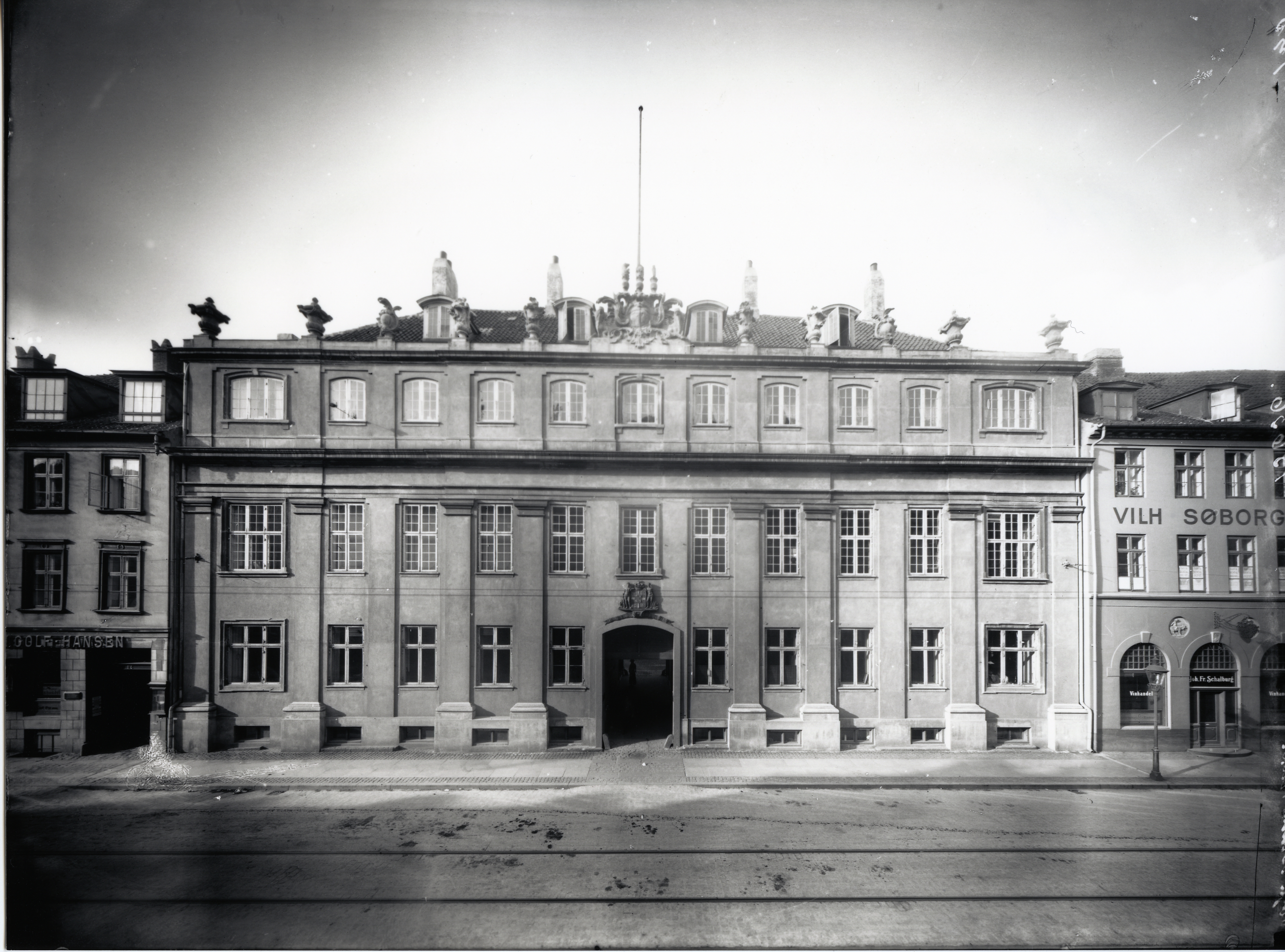
The Holstein Mansion photographed by Peter Elfelt in 1916.

A new building for the Natural History Museum was inaugurated in Krystalgade in 1871. The new museum building was designed by Christian Hansen. The building in Stormgade was sold to the insurance company Den almindelige Brandforsikring for Landbygninger (now Alm. Brand).

The Ministry of Housing purchased the building when Alm. Brand moved to new premises on the Midtermolen in the Southern Freeport in 1971.

== Architecture ==
The current exterior of the building mostly dates from Fortling's expansion in 1756. He added an extra floor topped by a balustrade decorated with vases and statues. The complex also comprises the two perpendicular rear wings from 1706 and a half-timbered building in the yard from the second half of the 17th century.

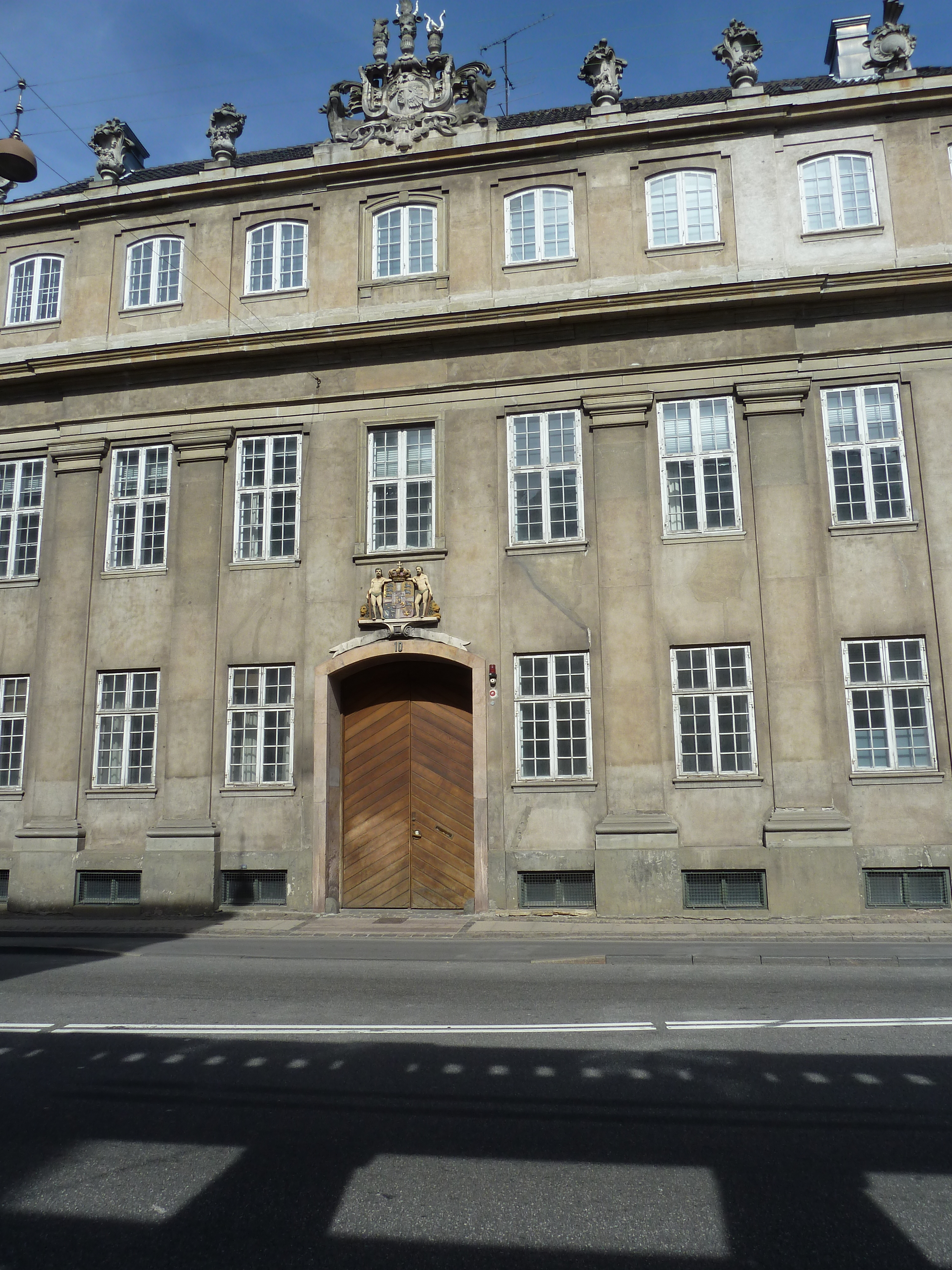
The central part of the facade

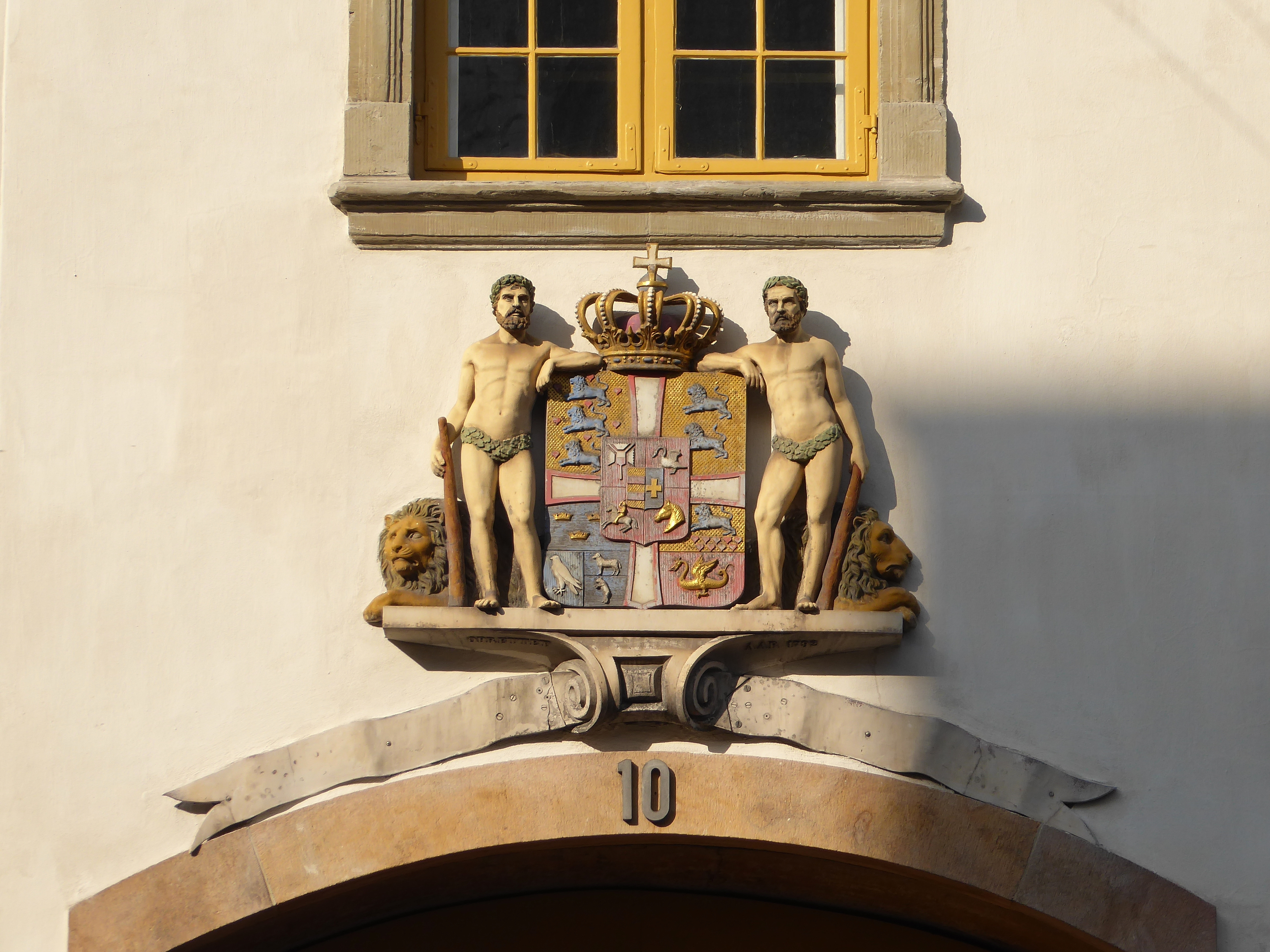
Heraldic statuary above the doorway

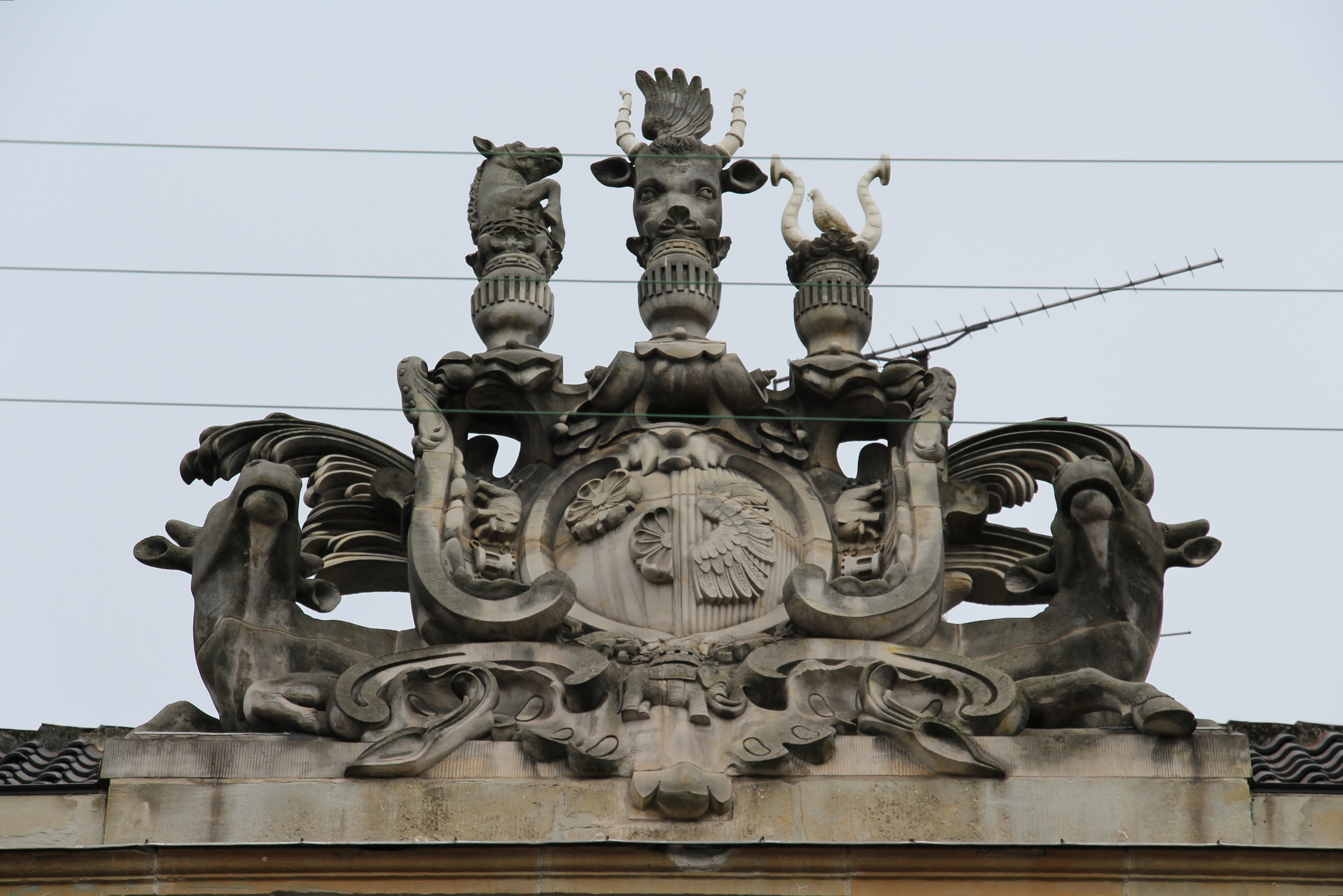

== Today ==
The building was converted into 12 apartments in 2016. They vary in size between 90 and 386 square metres.

== List of owners ==
- (1683-1700) Henning Ulrich von Lützow
- (1700-1711) E.U. Does
- (1711-1718) Valentin von Eickstedt
- (1718-1726) Andreas Weyse
- (1726-1730) Johan Georg von Holstein
- (1730-1750) Johan Ludvig Holstein
- (1750-1780) Christian Frederik Holstein
- (1780-1807) The von Holstein family
- (1807-1810) Christian Colbjørnsen
- (1810-1811) Amond Ammondsen
- (1811) Knud Bille Schack
- (1811-1827) Christian Cornelius Lerche
- (1827-1872) The Crown
- (1872-1971) Den almindelige Brandforsikring for Landbygninger
- (1971-) Ministry of Housing
