= Kastrup Værk =

Pottery and tile works in Kastrup, Denmark

Kastrup Works
- Kastrup Værk
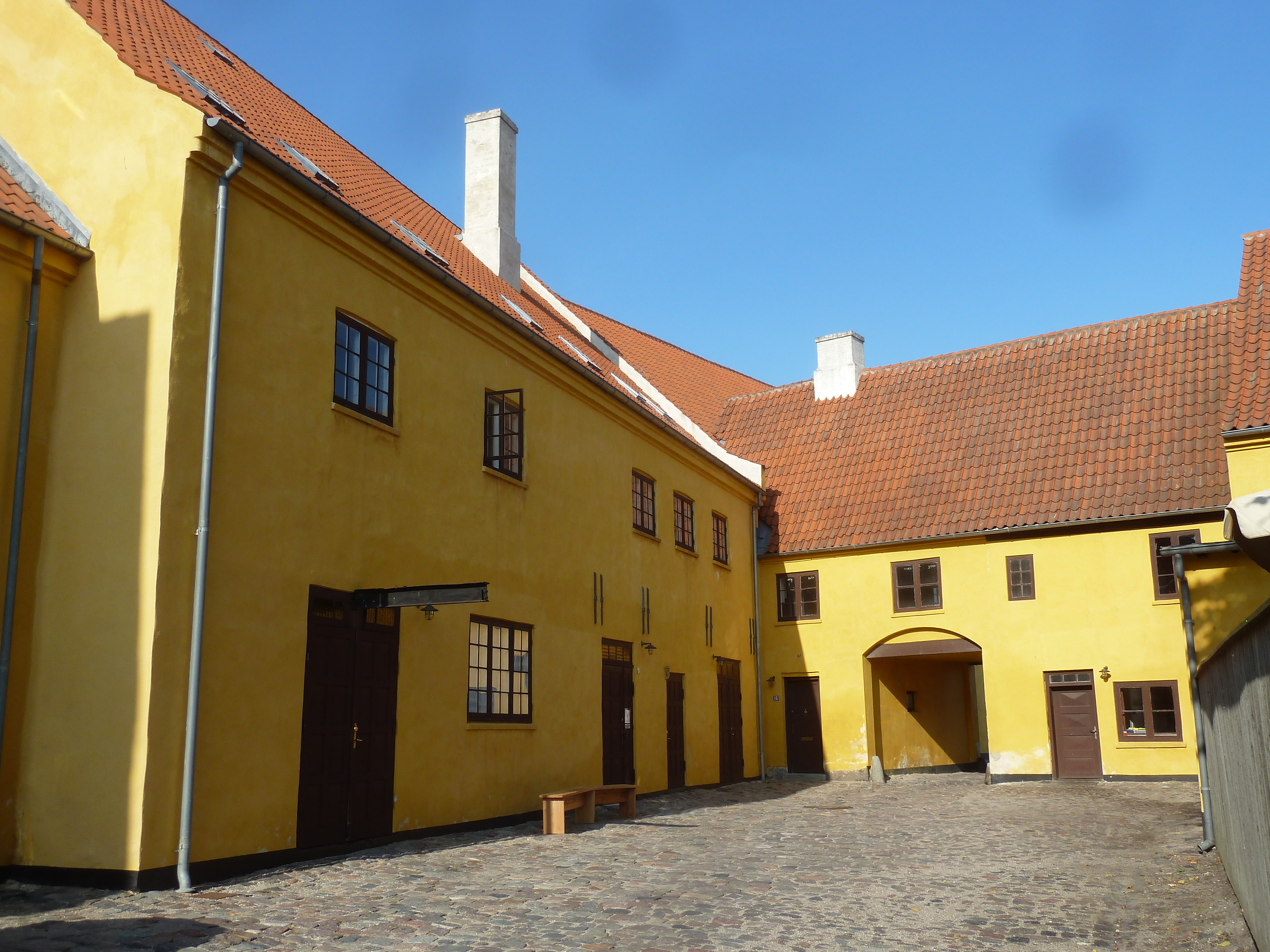
- In the central courtyard
- Interactive map of the Kastrup Works area

General information
- Architectural style: Baroque
- Location: Denmark
- Coordinates: 55°38′12″N 12°39′15″E
- Construction started: 1738
- Completed: 1749
- Owner: NCC

Design and construction
- Architect: Jacob Fortling

Kastrup Værk (English: Kastrup Works) was a pottery and tile works in Kastrup, now a suburb of Copenhagen, on the Danish island of Amager.

== History ==
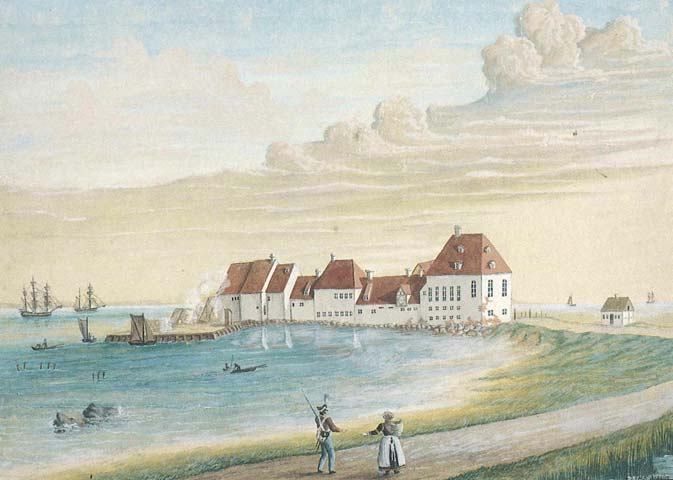
Kastrup Værk depicted by an unknown artist in 1730

Kastrup Værk was founded around 1750 by Jacob Fortling, a German sculptor who had emigrated to Denmark in 1729 and established a successful career as Royal Master Builder in Copenhagen. As one of several operators, he was granted rights to extract limestone on Saltholm, a smaller island in Øresund otherwise mainly used for summer grazing, and built an extensive complex of buildings between 1749 and 1753. Constructed on reclaimed land, it included a lime plant, a tile works and a faience factory as well as a main building and gate houses.

When Fortling died in 1761, his widow sold the plant to Jess Didrichsen, father of Danish-Norwegian writer Christiane Koren. Together with Jacob Stentzler, he operated the industrial complex under the name Didrichsen and Compagnie. The new owners continued operations until 1777, when it was sold once more and converted for other uses. For a while, in the 19th century, it was used as a brewery.

== Kastrup Værk today ==
Most of the buildings still exist today. It was renovated from 2006 to 2008 and turned into a mixture of residential units and offices. The location now lies between Copenhagen Airport and Amager Beach Park. The renovated buildings will be part of a larger redevelopment of the site, known as Scanport, will convert the old harbour into a marina and add a number of modern office buildings and hotel facilities. The masterplan for the area has been made by the architectural firm of schmidt hammer lassen.

The new national Danish aquarium, The Blue Planet, is located on a neighbouring site. Construction began in September 2010 and it was completed in 2013.

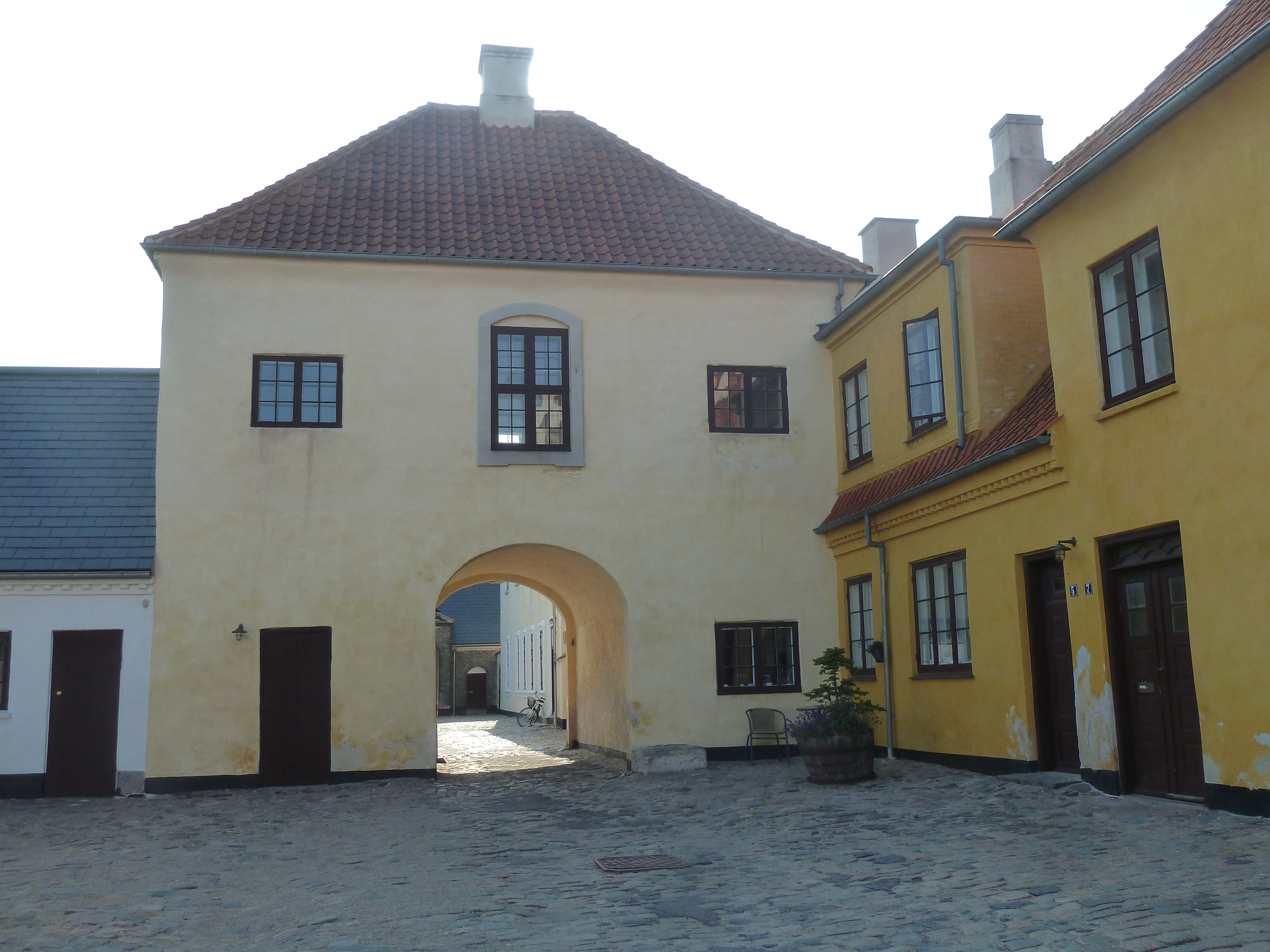
Kastrup Værk, gate house

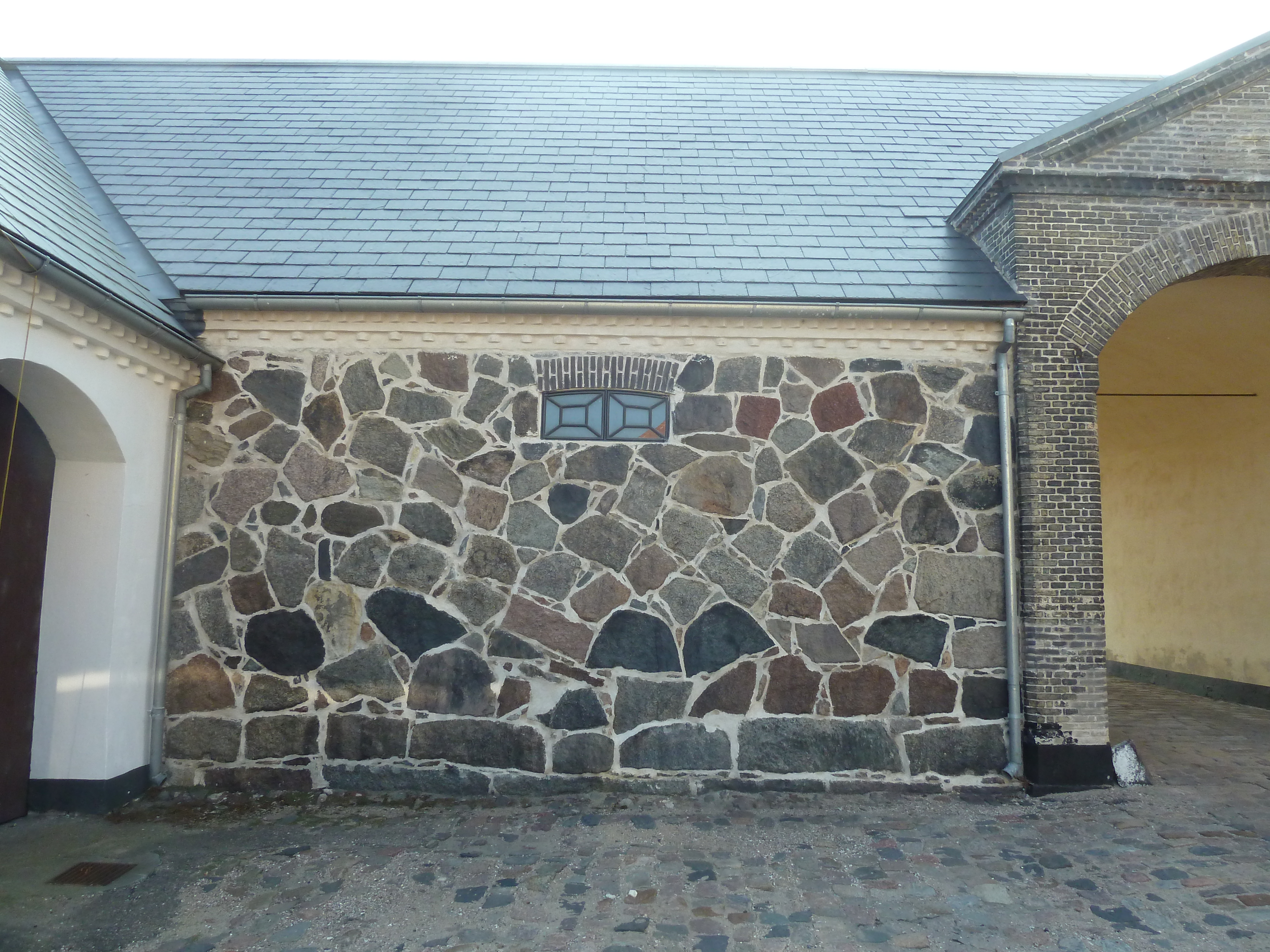
Kastrup Værk, exterior wall

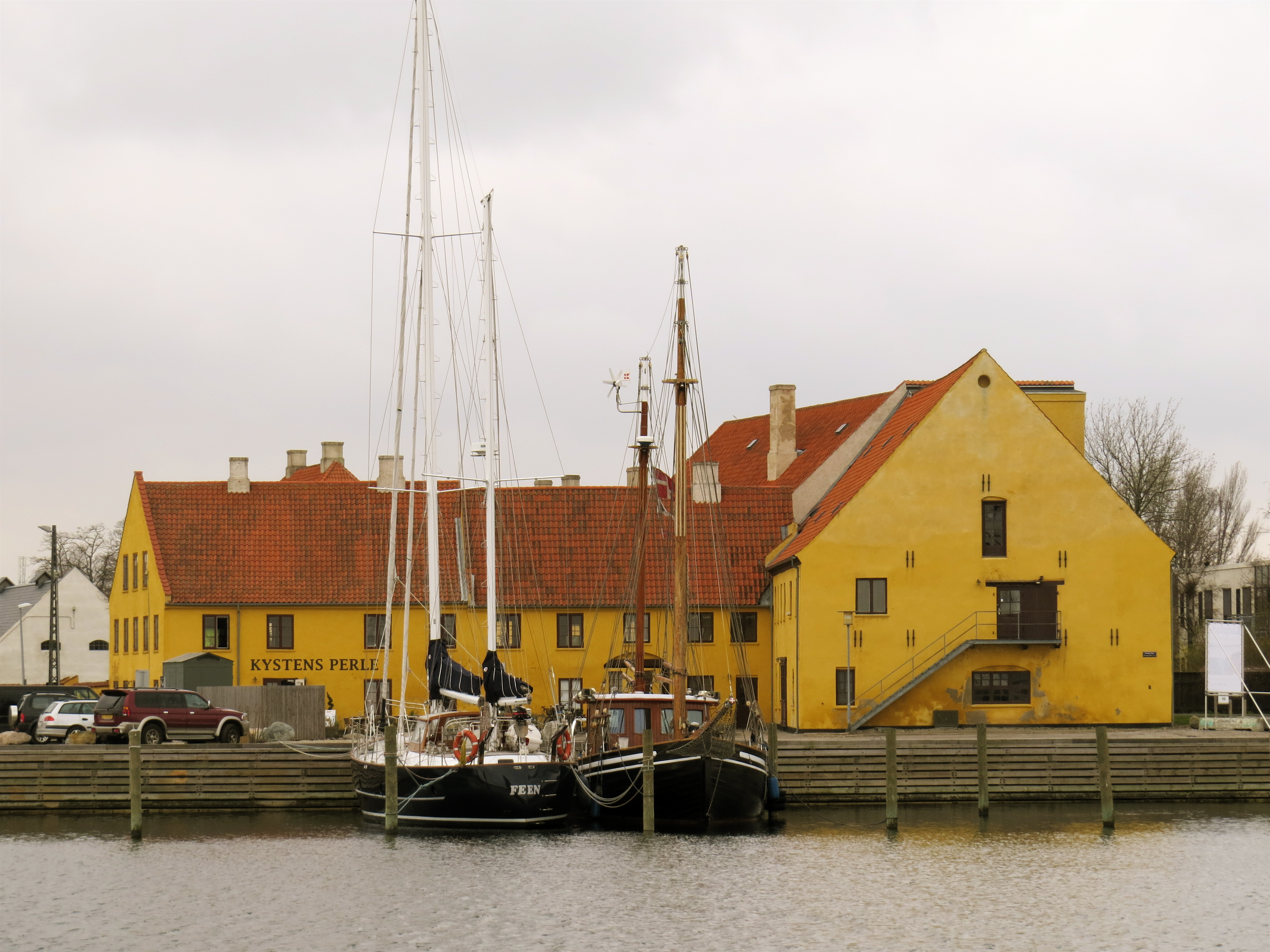
Kastrup Værk, Kastrup Harbor

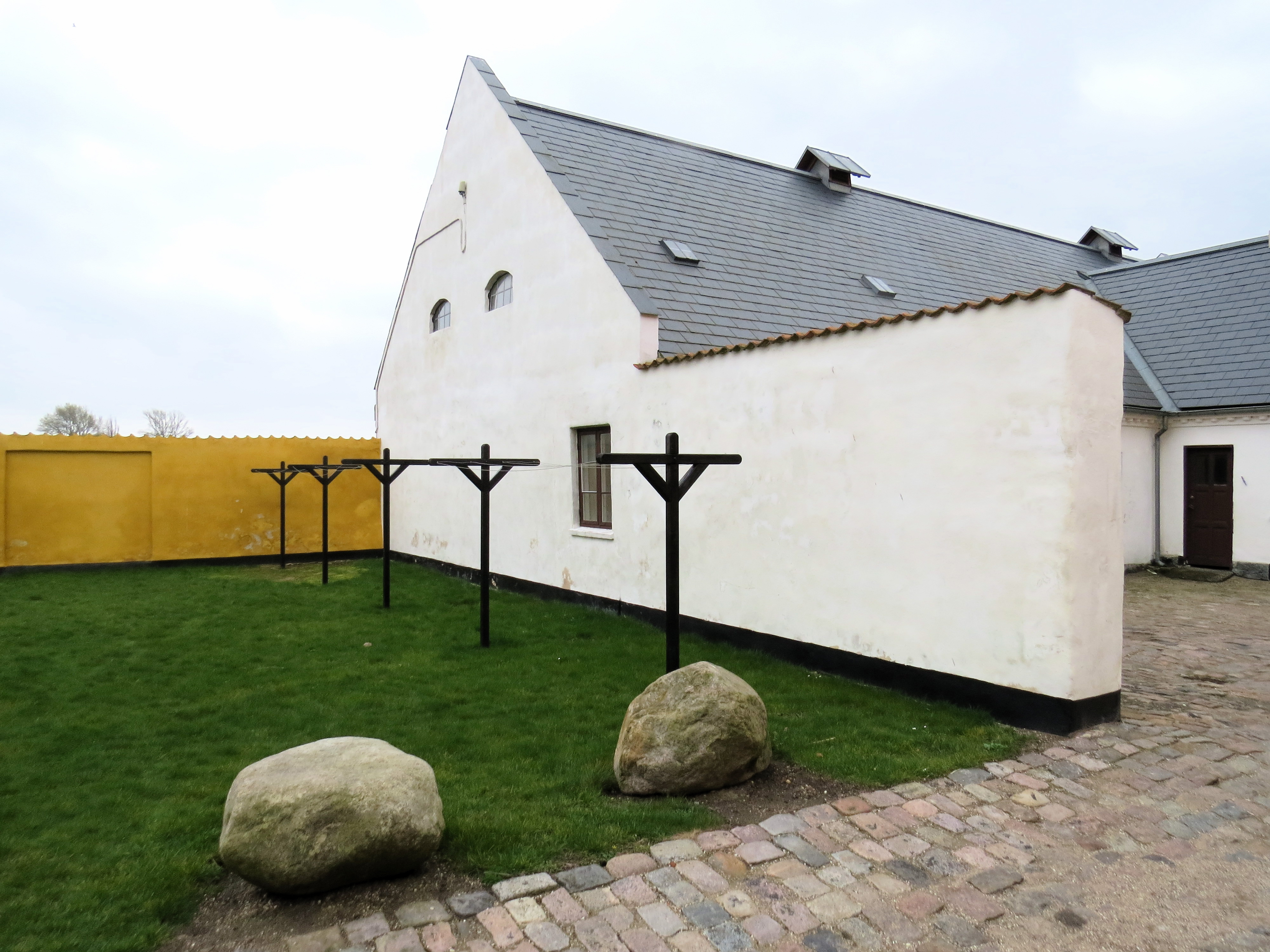
Kastrup Værk, Bryggergården

== See also ==
- Brede Works
- Kastrupgård
- Store Kongensgade Faience Manufactury
- Kastrup Brewery

== Other sources ==
- Pedersen, Kirsten Nørregaard (2011) Kastrup Værk Bryggergården- 1749-1900 (Forlaget Rhodos) ISBN 9788779990067
