= Jacob Fortling =

German-Danish sculptor

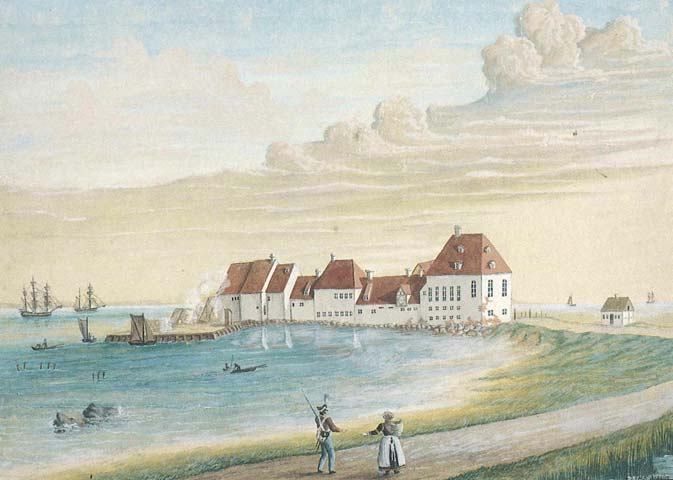
Kastrup Værk, established by Fortling between 1749 and 1753, watercolour by an unknown artist (1830)

Jacob Fortling (23 December 1711 – 16 July 1761) was a German-Danish sculptor, architect and industrialist, described as one of the most industrious people in the Denmark of his day. He came to Denmark at age 18 and embarked on a successful career, first as a sculptor and later also as an architect. He was also engaged in the production of building materials, owning several quarries in Norway. Just outside Copenhagen, on Amager's east coast, he founded Kastrup Værk, a large industrial facility combining a lime plant, a brickyard and a pottery.

Kastrupgård, his former home, has been turned into an art museum.

== Biography ==
=== Early life and career as a sculptor ===
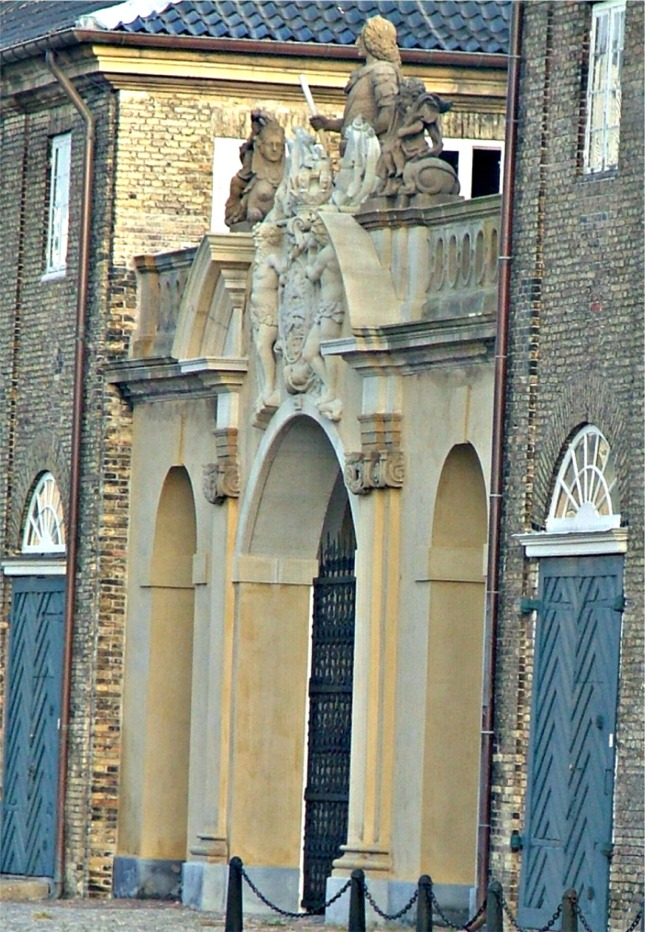
The King's Gate at Holmen

Fortling was born on 23 December 1711 in Bayreuth in present day Germany. He trained as a mason and stone carver and came to Denmark to work on the many large Royal building projects under King Christian VI, collaborating with sculptors such as Jacques Saly and Simon Carl Stanley. He executed the Queen's Staircase at Christiansborg Palace.

In 1738 he received Danish citizenship and was in 1740 appointed Stone Carver to the Danish Court. In the 1740s he worked on Christiansborg Palace where his contributions included the Queen's Staircase. He also created the main staircases for Ledreborg Palace and the Holstein Mansion in Copenhagen (1756). At the naval base at Holmen, he created the King's Gate.

=== Turn to architecture ===
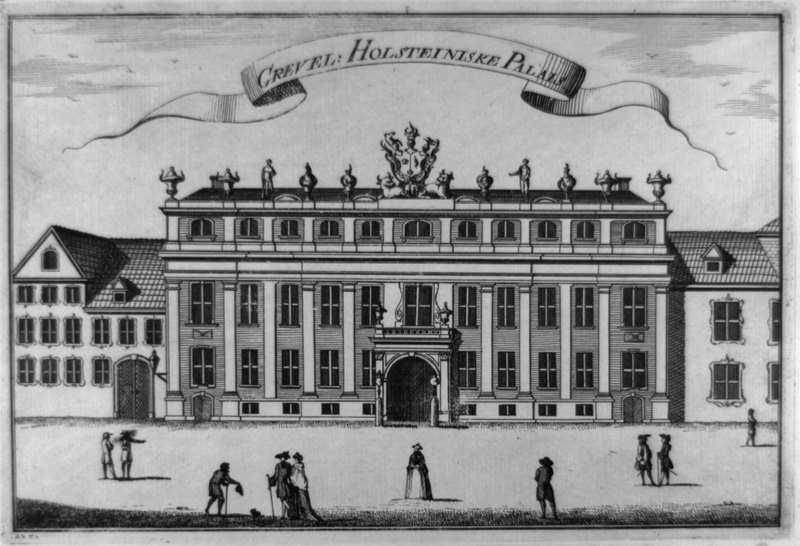
The Holstein Mansion in Copenhagen, engraving from 1762

Fortling collaborated closely with both Lauritz de Thurah and Nicolai Eigtved, the two leading Danish architects of the time, and finally completed his training as an architect. He assimilated Eigtved's refined Rococo style and, after Eigtved's death in 1754, became de Thurah's right-hand man.

In 1756, he was appointed Royal Building Inspector for Copenhagen, Zealand and Falster and, after de Thurah's death, he became Royal Building Master in 1760 but died the following year.

=== Quarries in Norway ===
Fortling also engaged in the production of building materials. In search of good quality stone, he made two journeys to Norway which was ruled by the Danish King and supplied many of the minerals used in the building industry in Denmark at that time. In 1744 he acquired royal privileges for two quarries, one at Akershus and one at Lier, extracting marble and from 1849 also talc. In 1759 he also established a quarry at Trondheim.

=== Activities at Kastrup ===
In Denmark, Fortling established a limestone quarry on Saltholm, an island in Øresund off the coast of Amager, and opened a lime plant at Kastrup Værk, with its own harbour on an artificial peninsula in 1749. He soon diversified with a brickyard (1752) and a pottery specializing in faience (1755) at the same site.

From 1749 to 1753, he also built Kastrupgåtf in the same area, a large country house and agricultural estate where he took up residence when it was completed. His business enterprises also included a distillery and a brewery.

== Works ==
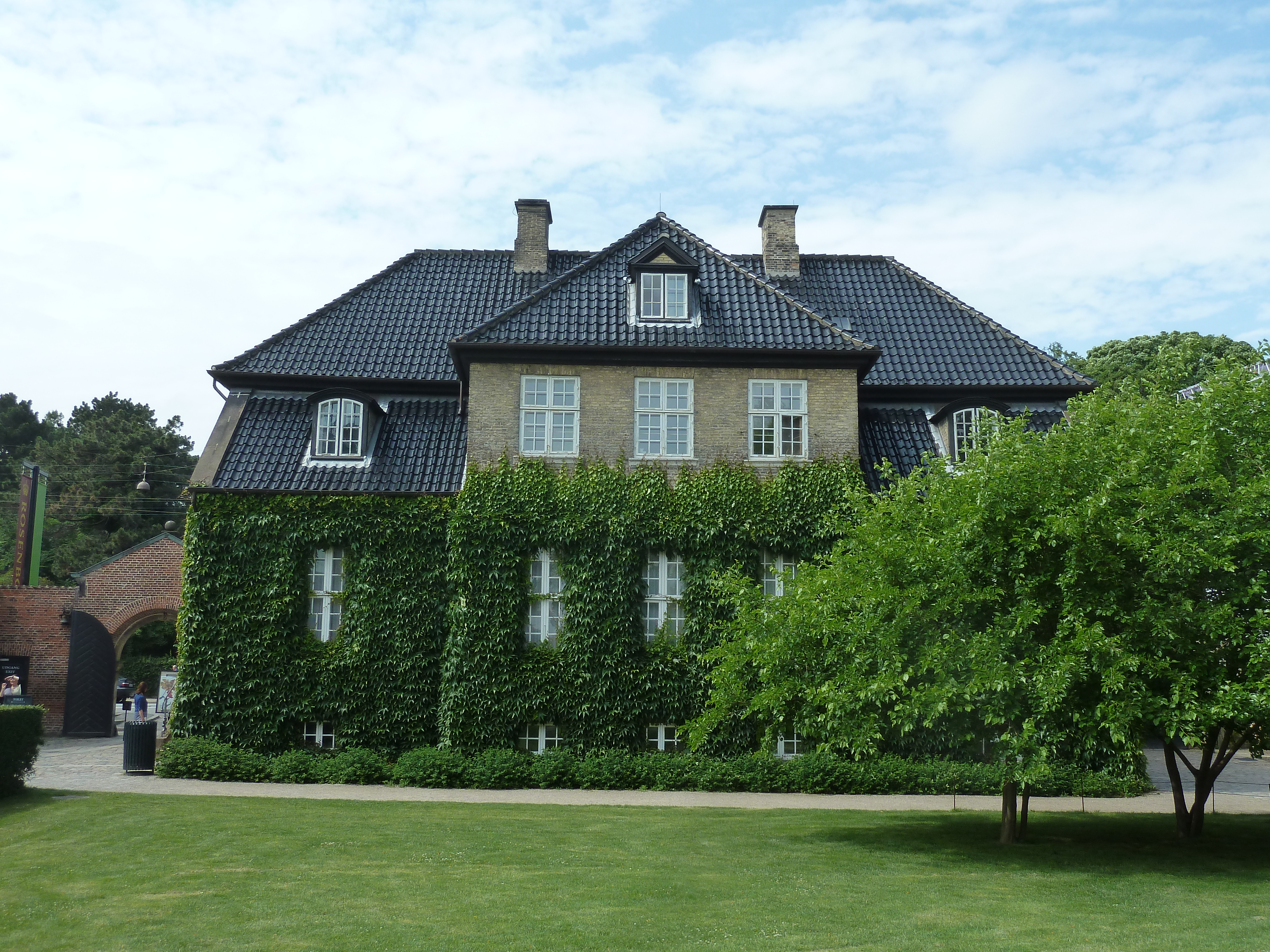
The Commandant's House at Rosenborg Castle Garden (1763)

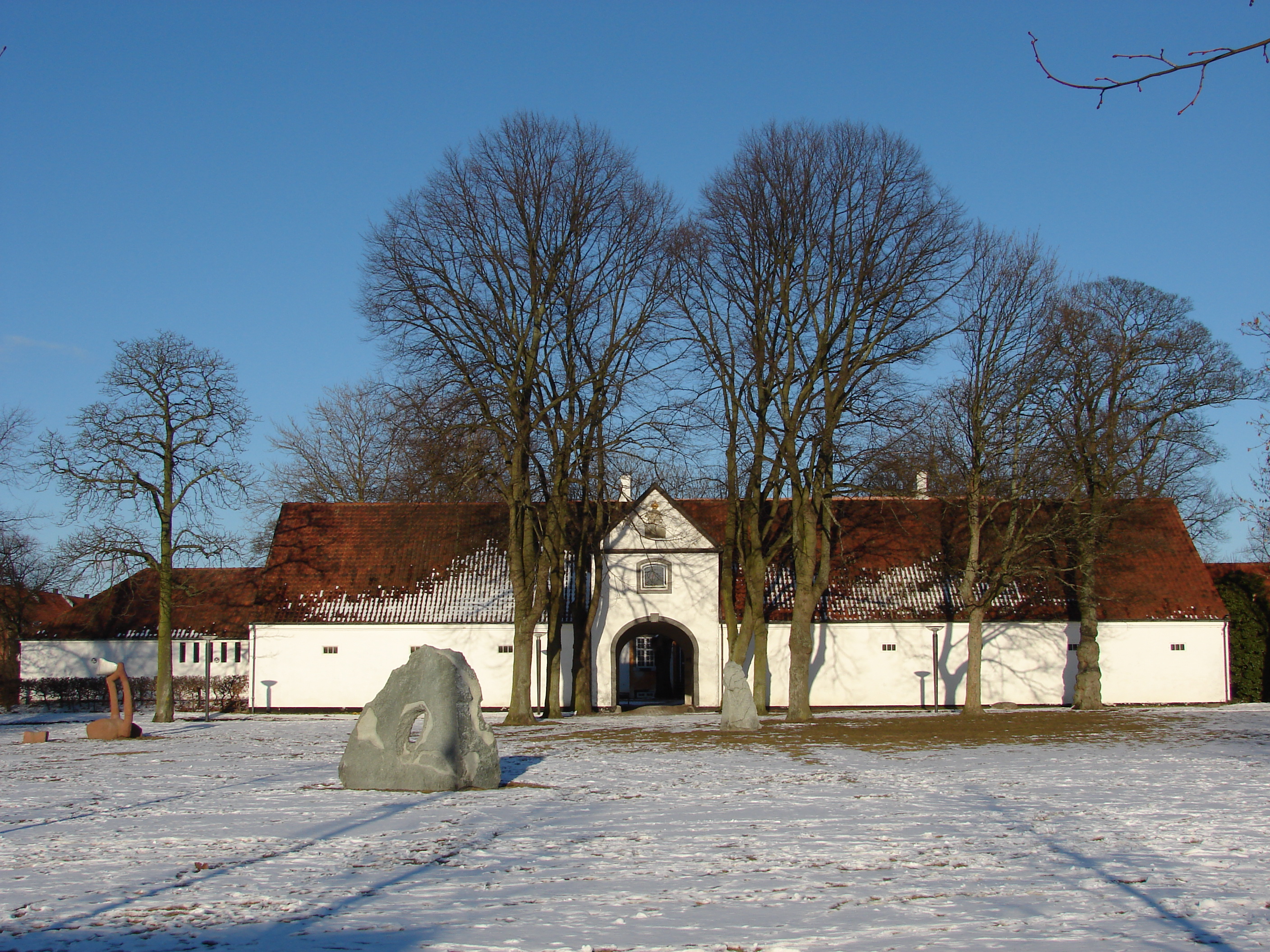
Kastrupgård

- Work on Christiansborg Palace, including the Queen's Staircase (1733–40, burnt 1794)
- Decorative work on Ledreborg Palace, including main staircase (1743–50)
- King's Gate at the Arsenalet at Holmen, Copenhagen (1745–47)
- Town house (next to Barchmann Mansion), Ny Kongensgade, Copenhagen (after 1747)
- Kastrup Værk with harbour (1749–53)
- Kastrupgård, Kastrup (1749–53)
- Lindencrone Mansion, Bredgade/Sankt Annæ Plads, Copenhagen (1751–54, attributed)
- Portal for Frederiksberg Gardens (except the vases later added by Johann Friedrich Hänel) (1755)
- Rebuilding of the Schack Mansion, Amalienborg Palace, Copenhagen (1755–57, with Johan Boye Junge)
- Extra floor and balustrade, vestibule and main staircase, Holstein Mansion, Stormgade, Copenhagen (1756)
- Decorative works, Christian's Church, Christianshavn, Copenhagen (1755–59)
- Tower at Gråbrødre Church, Viborg (1760)
- Connabder's House, Rosenborg Castle, Copenhagen (1760)
- Extra floor, Marshall's House, Fredensborg Palace, Fredensborg (1760–61)
- Nesstofa at Seltjarnarnes, Iceland

== See also ==
- Architecture of Denmark
