= Tårnby Municipality =

Tårnby Municipality Tårnby Kommune (Danish)
- Municipality
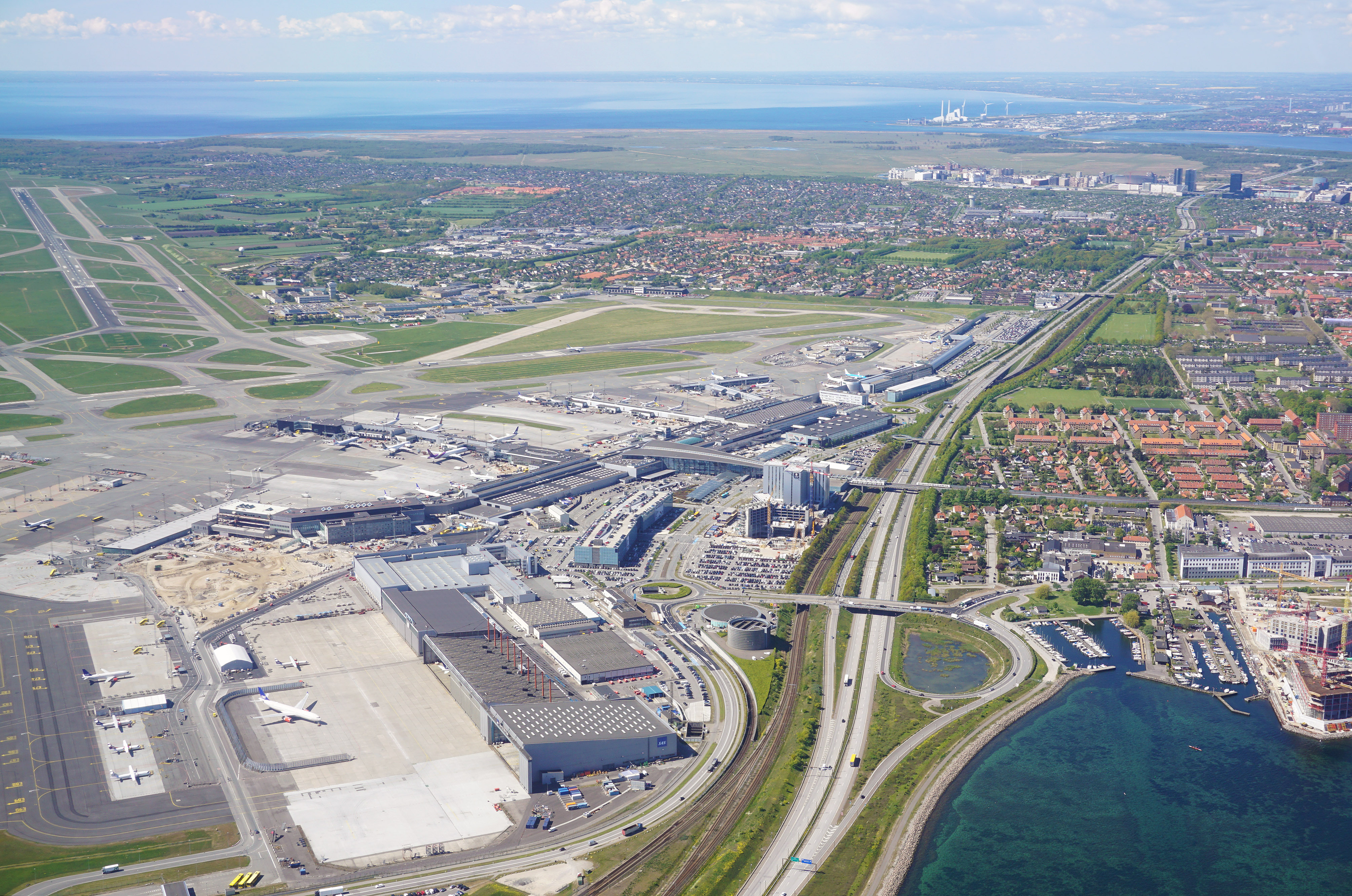

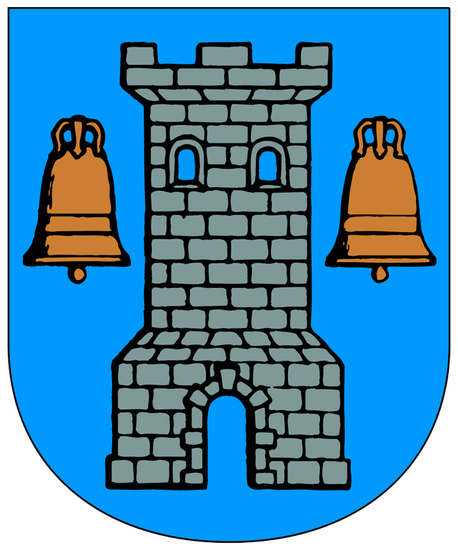
- Coat of arms

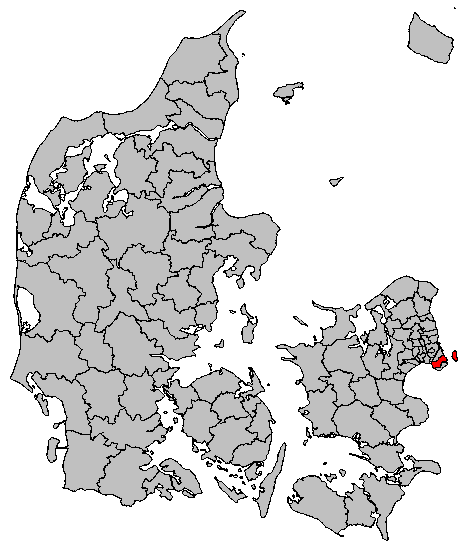
- Country: Denmark
- Region: Hovedstaden
- Established: 1 April 1970
- Seat: Tårnby

Government
  - Mayor: Allan Andersen (S)

Area
  - Total: 64.95 km^{2} (25.08 sq mi)

Population (1 January 2026)
  - Total: 44,214
  - Density: 680.7/km^{2} (1,763/sq mi)
- Time zone: UTC+1 (CET)
  - Summer (DST): UTC+2 (CEST)
- Postal code: 2770
- Municipal code: 185
- Website: www.taarnby.dk

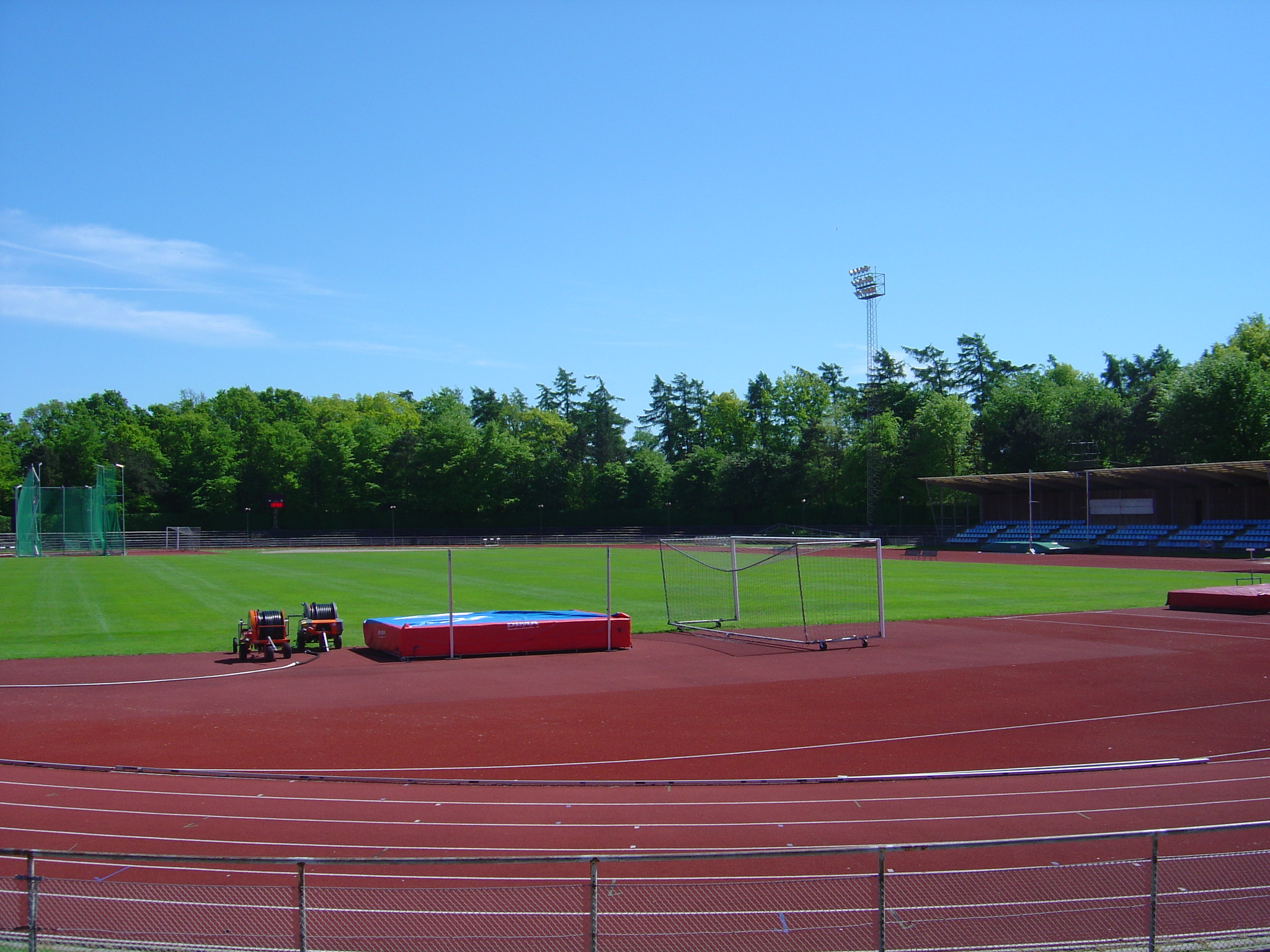
Taarnby Stadion Opvisningsbanen

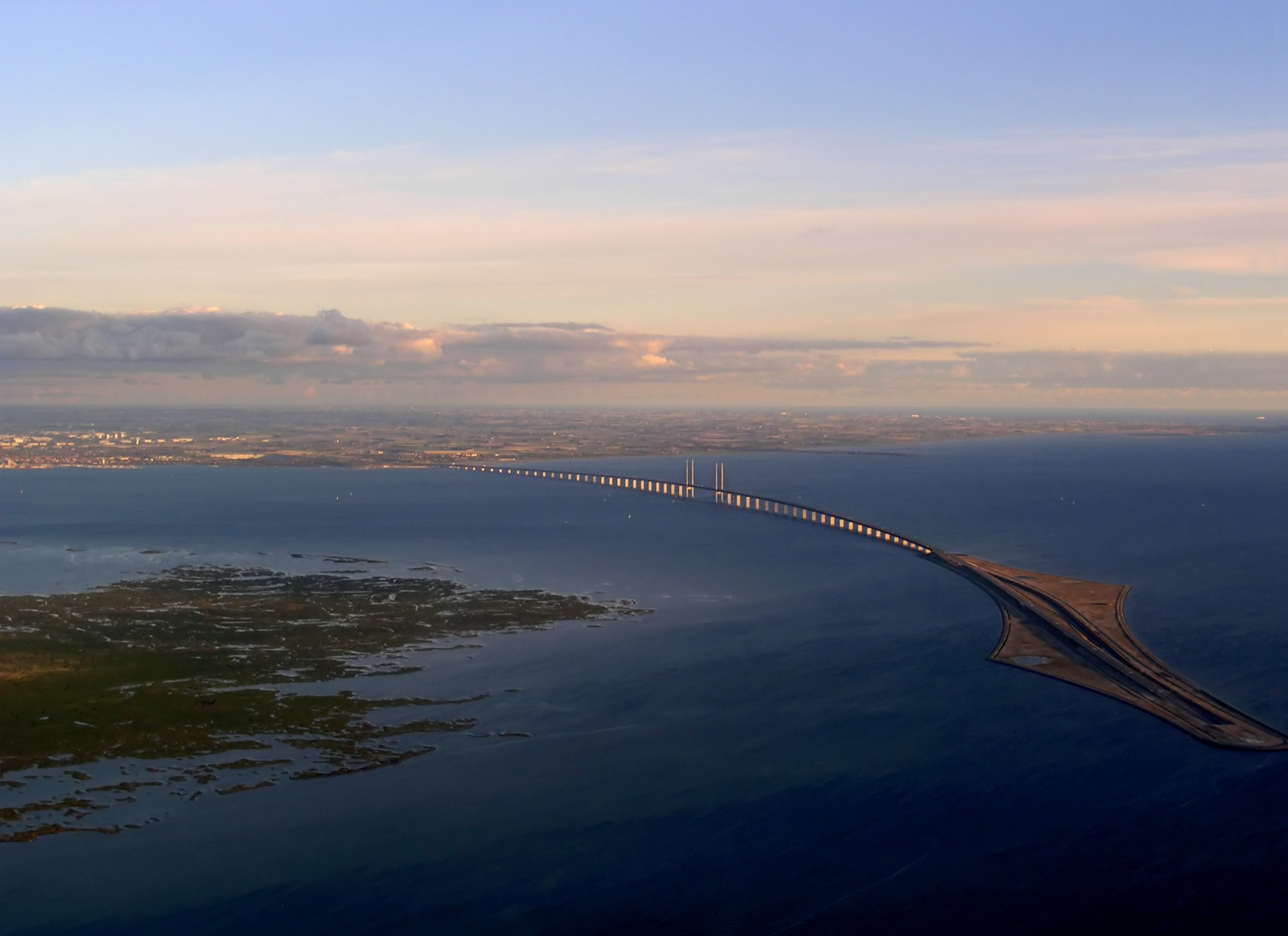
Øresund Bridge from Denmark to Sweden. On the right the artificial Peberholm and on the left Saltholm. This picture is taken from the air.

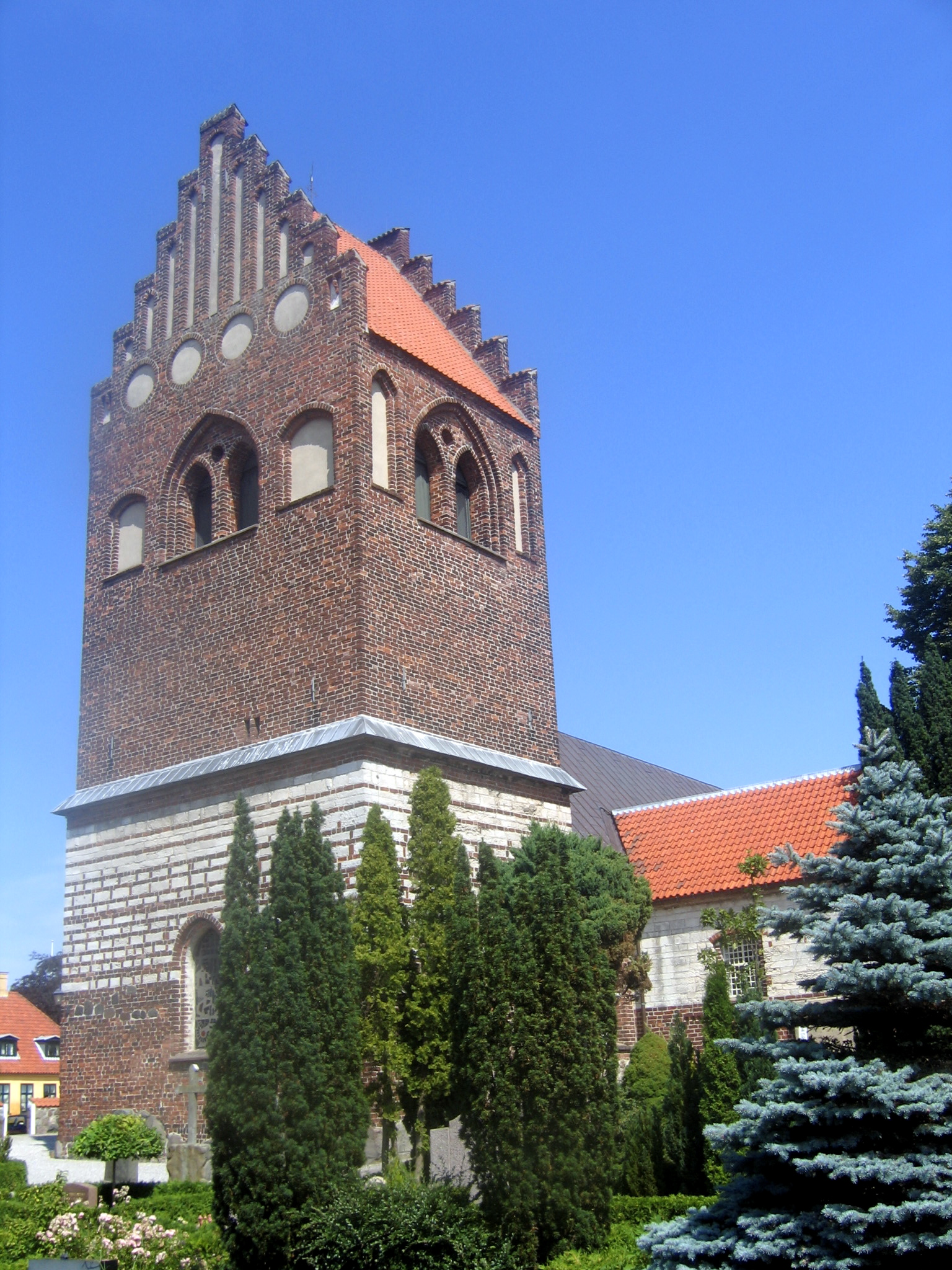
Tårnby church

Tårnby Municipality (Danish: Tårnby Kommune, Danish pronunciation: [ˈtsʰɒːnˌpyˀ kʰoˈmuːnə]) is a kommune bordering Copenhagen Municipality on the island of Amager just east of Zealand in eastern Denmark. The municipality includes the islands of Saltholm (16 km^{2}; 2 inhabitants 1 January 2020) and Peberholm (1.3 km^{2}), and covers an area of 64.95 km^{2} of which 48.9 on Amager. It has a population of 44,214 (1 January 2026). Its mayor is Allan S. Andersen, a member of the Social Democrats (Socialdemokraterne) political party.

== Overview ==
The municipality is primarily an amalgamation of the formerly independent towns of Tårnby and Kastrup, as well as the earlier villages of Ullerup and Tømmerup. The municipal council is located in the Kastrup section of the municipality. Tårnby municipality was not merged with other municipalities on 1 January 2007 as part of nationwide Kommunalreformen ("The Municipal Reform" of 2007).

Tårnby is divided into three main built up districts: Kastrup, Tårnby, and Vestamager. Kastrup in the north-east is marked by higher density apartments and harbour facilities; Tårnby, west of Kastrup, is known for its older houses, row houses, and some apartments; Vestamager, to the west of the airport, is known for its smaller houses and gardens. Most of the community's infrastructure is fairly evenly spread throughout the municipality.

Neighbouring municipalities are Copenhagen to the north and Dragør to the south. These three municipalities cover the entirety of Amager island. To the east is the Øresund (the Sound), the strait which separates Zealand from Sweden. To the west is Køge Bay (Køge Bugt).

The E20 Amager Motorway (Amagermotorvejen) / Øresund Motorway (Øresundsmotorvejen) runs through Tårnby, where in the east it crosses over the Øresund and over the island of Peberholm to Sweden as the Øresund Bridge, and to the west it crosses over Køge Bay to Avedøre Holme in Hvidovre municipality as the 241-meter long Kalvebod Bridge (Kalvebodbroen).

Most of Copenhagen Airport lies in the municipality. In fact, the airport takes up about 19% of the municipality's area. The airport has had a strong impact on the area, as the national significance of the international airport has sometimes taken precedence over local wishes. However, the airport is also a major employer and benefit for the local economy.

Demographically, Tårnby is slightly older than most of Copenhagen. This trend is expected to become more pronounced in the coming years. Income is slightly less than the average of the approximately 20 municipalities closest to the municipality of Copenhagen.

Politically the municipality has been very stable. From the 1930s until the early 21st century there were only 4 different mayors, all social democrats. The town council has always a majority of social democrats. The municipality has the 5th. lowest tax rate in Denmark. However, the service level is still relatively high.

The first mention of Tårnby in the historical record was in 1135.

Much of the community was still quite rural until the mid 20th century when expansion of the airport, construction of new highways and streets, and a population boom in Copenhagen encouraged the construction of apartments and row housing.

== Economy ==
Scandinavian Airlines System SAS Cargo and SAS Denmark have their offices in Kastrup. Transavia Denmark also has its head office in Kastrup.

When SAS Commuter operated its head office was in Kastrup. When Danair operated, its head office was also in Kastrup.

== Politics ==
=== Municipal council ===
Tårnby's municipal council consists of 19 members, elected every four years.

Below are the municipal councils elected since the Municipal Reform of 2007.

Election	Party							Total seats	Turnout	Elected mayor
Election	A	B	C	F	O	V	Ø	Total seats	Turnout	Elected mayor
2005	9	1	1	2	2	2		17	62.3%	Henrik Zimino (A)
2009	8		1	4	4	2		19	60.7%	Henrik Zimino (A)
2013	8	1	1	1	3	4	1	19	70.0%	Henrik Zimino (A)
2017	8	1	2	1	3	3	1	19	67.2%	Allan S. Andersen (A)
Data from Kmdvalg.dk 2005, 2009, 2013 and 2017

== Notable people ==
- Niki Zimling (born 1985), footballer

== Culture ==
- Kastrupgård Collection
