= Jægersborg Allé =

Street in Copenhagen, Denmark

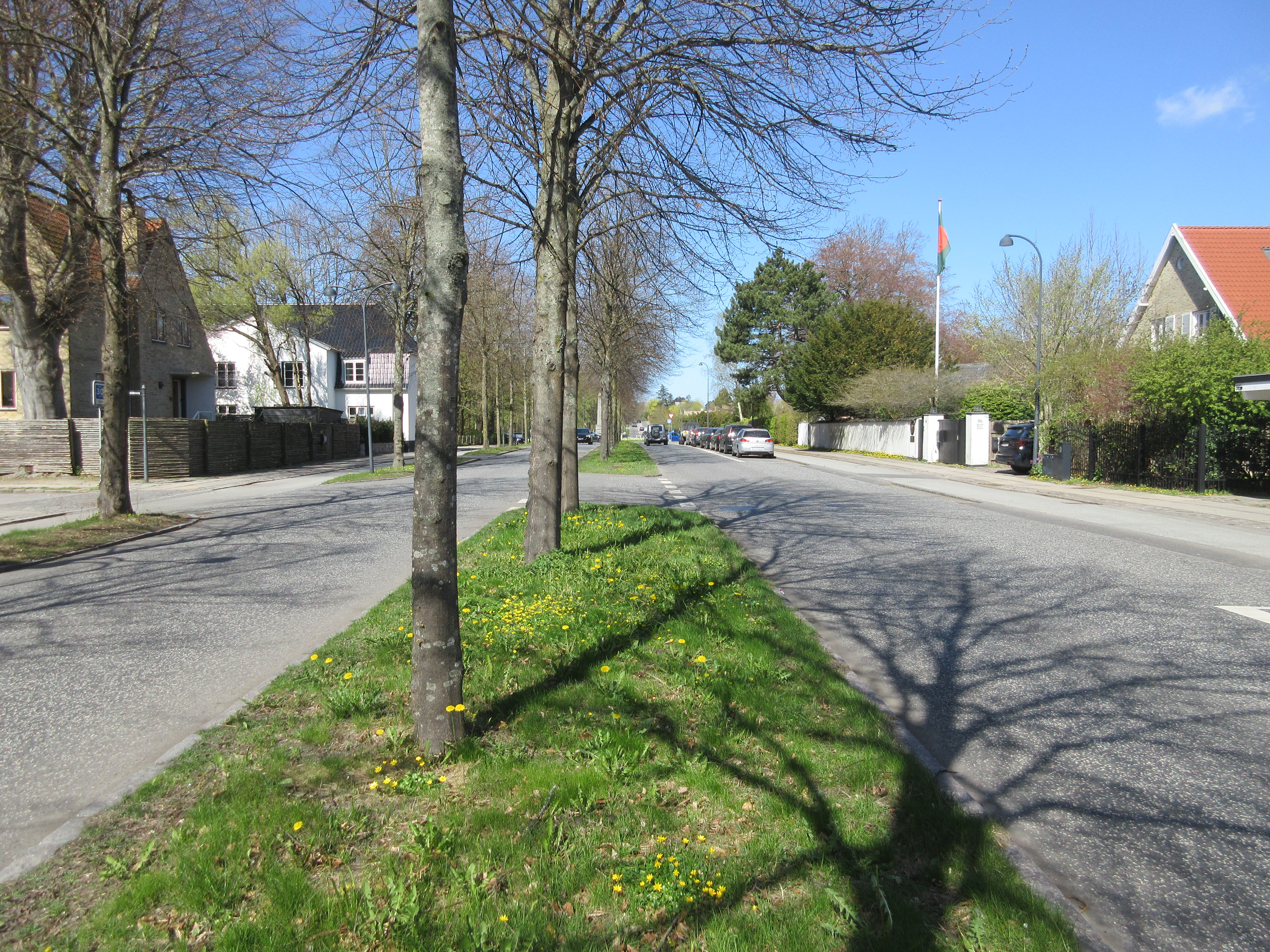
- Interactive map of Jægersborg Allé
- Length: 4400
- Location: Gentofte Municipality, Copenhagen, Denmark
- Quarter: Charlottenlund and Jægersborg
- Southeast end: Strandvejen
- Major junctions: Bernstorffsvej
- Northwest end: Jægersborgvej

Construction
- Construction start: 1696
- Completion: 1708

Other
- Known for: Charlottenlund Palace

Jægersborg Allé is a major street in the Charlottenlund and Jægersborg neighborhoods of Gentofte Municipality in the northern suburbs of Copenhagen, Denmark. It runs from Strandvejen in the southeast to a junction just east of Jægersborg railway station in the northwest. The first leg of the road passes through Charlottenlund Forest, and it later follows the north boundary of Bernstorff Park. It passes a number of historic buildings, including Charlottenlund Palace, Bernstorff Palace and Schæffergården.

== History ==
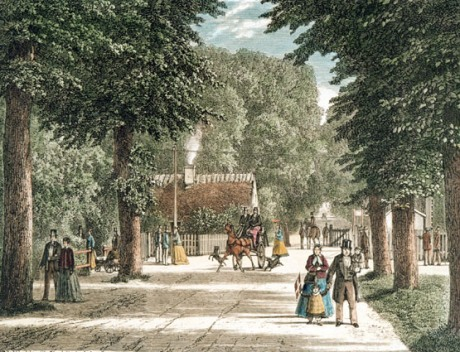
Jægersborg Allé in the first half of the 19th century

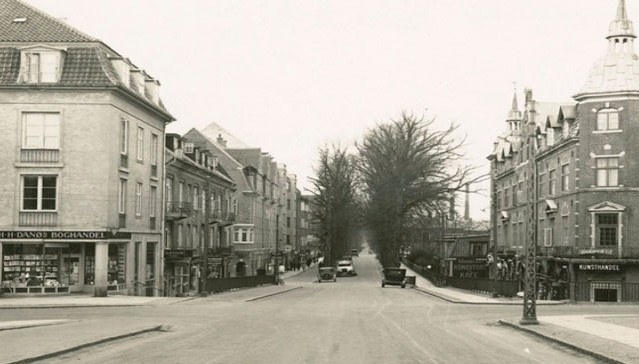
Jægersborg Allé after the turn of the century

Jægersborg Allé was built on the orders of King Christian V by farmers from the parish of Gentofte. It is first mentioned in 1695, and it is believed that it was completed in the summer of 1706. The road provided a direct connection between Jægersborg and Gyldenlund and would also be used for royal hunts. He also constructed a pheasantry en route between the two properties. It was used for breeding pheasants for the royal hunts. Christian V died in 1699, and therefore, never saw his road finished.

Gyldenlund was taken over by queen Charlotte Amalie and replaced by Charlottenlund Palace in 1730–733. J.H.E. Bernstorff received the Pheasantry from the king and constructed Bernstorff House at the site. Jægersborg was replaced by the Hermitage in Jægersborg Deer Garden and demolished in circa 1760. Bernstorffvej was constructed in 1770, linking the Royal Frederiksborg Road with Bernstorff House and Jægersborg Allé.

In 1829, Jægersborg Allé was finally opened to the public. Carriages had to pay a fee which was collected at a boom barrier in Charlottenlund. The area became more accessible with the opening of the Klampenborg and Lyngby Railways in 1863. The land along the road was gradually built over.

== Notable buildings and residents ==
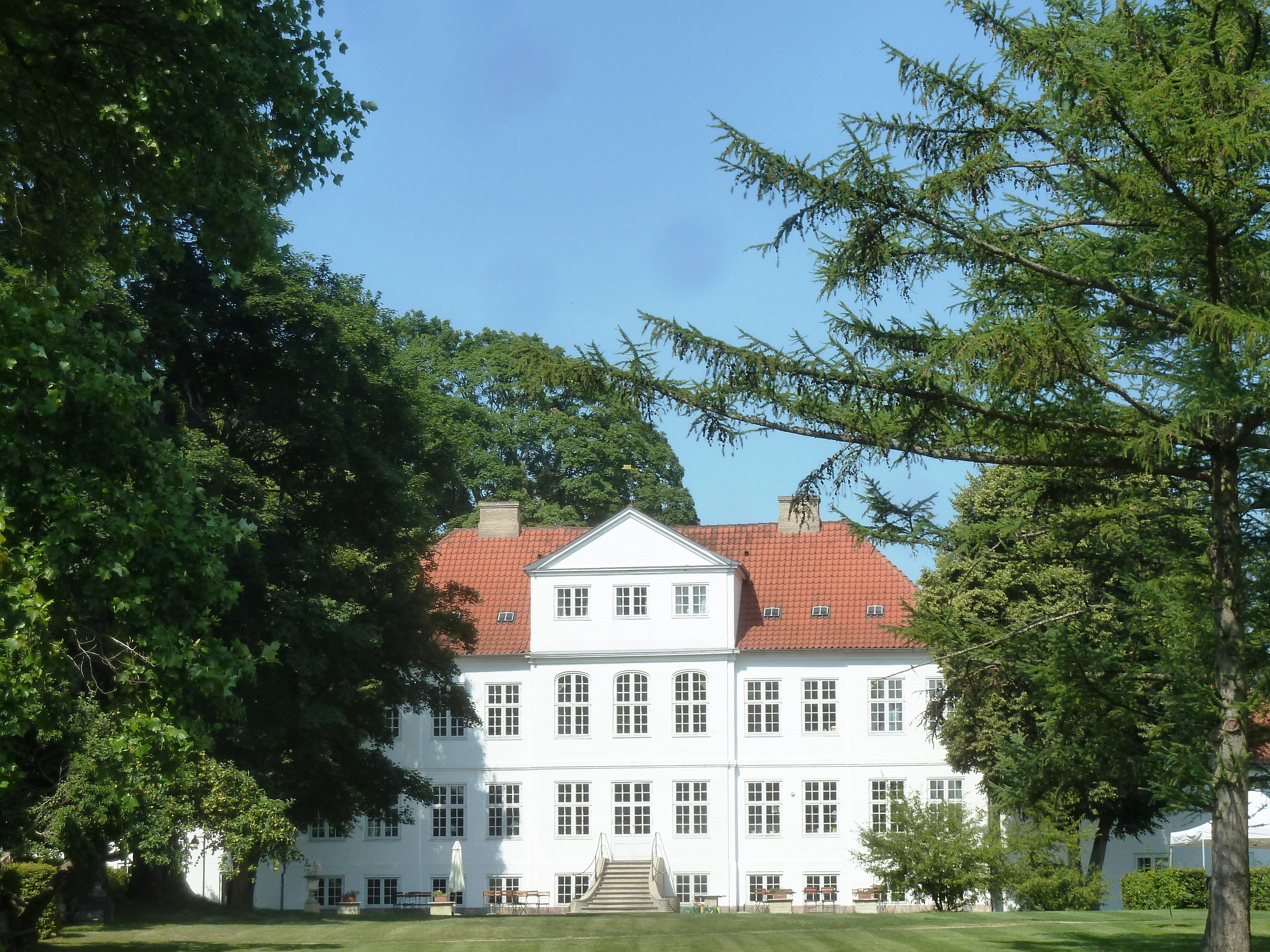
No. 166: Schæffergården

Charlottenlund Palace (No. 1A) is currently home to DTU Aqua. The small building at No. 2A is a former garage for a horse-drawn fire carriage. Its location next to the still existing restaurant Ved Stalden ("At the Stables") meant that horses were always present at the site in the event of fire. The building is from 1882 and was designed by Ferdinand Meldahl.

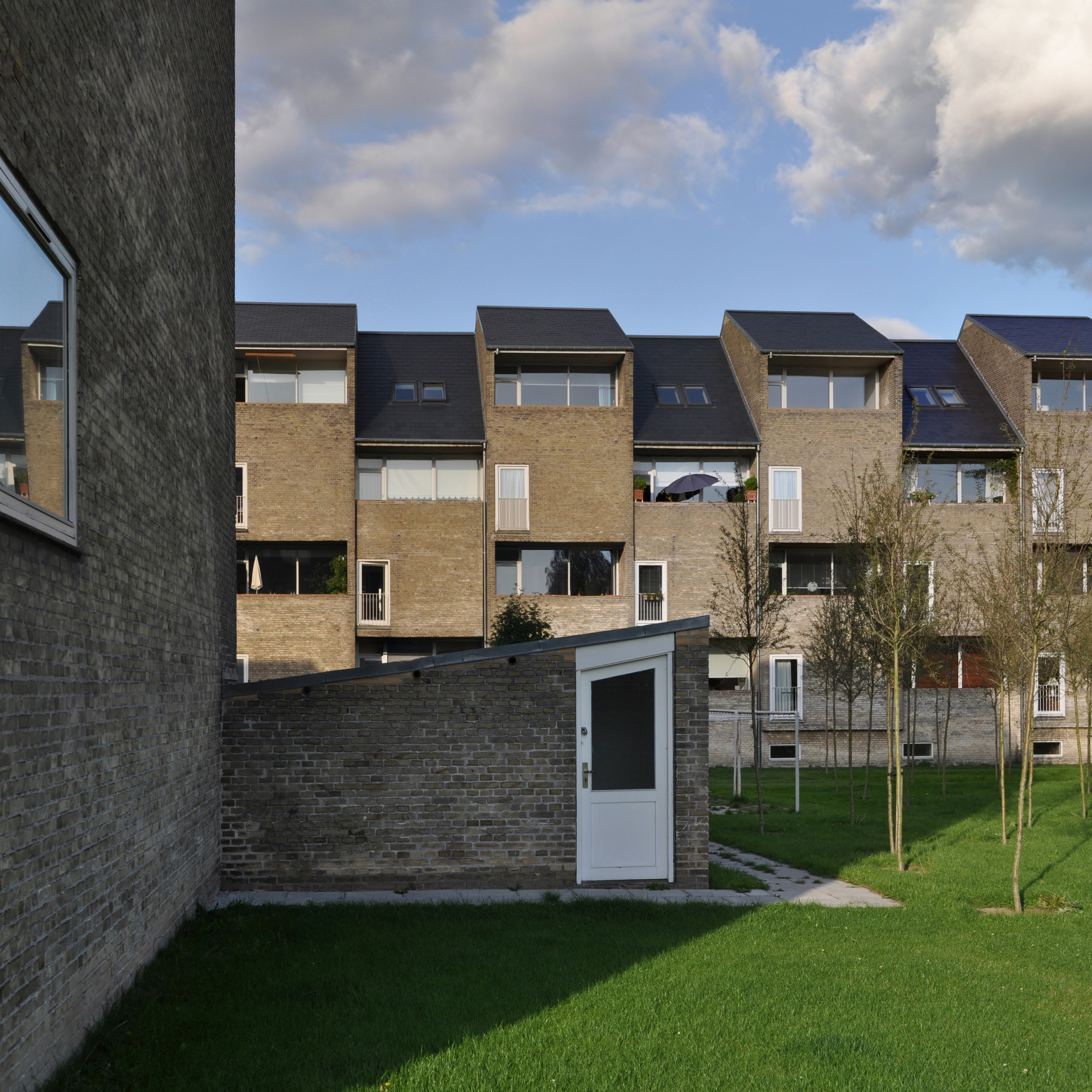
No. 185-229; Alle husene

Lille Bernstorff (No. 17), formerly known as Trianglen, is a house from 1811. The buildings at No. 92–94 and 90, an L-shaped main building and a stable, both from c. 1800, are also listed.

Jægergården (No. 150), a complex of low, tallow buildings, was built in the 1750s to design by Lauritz de Thurah. It was for a while used and as stables for the king's hunting dogs and from the 1790s as army barracks. Schæffergården (No. 166) is a Rococo-style mansion from 1756. It has later been expanded and is now operated as a hotel and conference centre. The house "Ibstrup" at No. 170 A has nothing to do with the much older and long gone predecessor of Jægersborg Castle. The L-shaped main building is from 1867 and listed.

Alléhusene (No. 185-229), a development of terraced housing, was built in 148–53 to design by Arne Jacobsen.

Chr. Olesen & Co., a manufacturer and distributor of ingredients for the animal feed, food and pharma industries, is based at No. 164.

== Monuments and memorials ==
A Femvejen, a roundabout where Jægersborg Allé, Bernstorffsvej, Ordrupvej and two others roads meet, is a memorial to King Christian IX and Queen Louise. The memorial was designed by the architect Andreas Vlemmesen and executed by the sculptor Anders Bundgaard. It was unveiled on 6 September 1913.

Outside Jægersborg Allé 184 is a stone commemorating Jørgen Haagen Schmith, better known under the codename Citronen (Danish for the Lemon), a prominent member of the Danish resistance movement during World War II, who was killed at the site early in the morning on 15 October 1944.

== Transport ==
Charlottenlund railway station, a station of the Klampenborg radial of the S-train network, is located circa one kilometre from the coast. Jægersborg railway station, a station on the Hillerød radial, is located just west of its western end.
