= Charlottenlund Palace =

Coordinates: 55°45′1″N 12°34′50″E

- Charlottenlund Slot
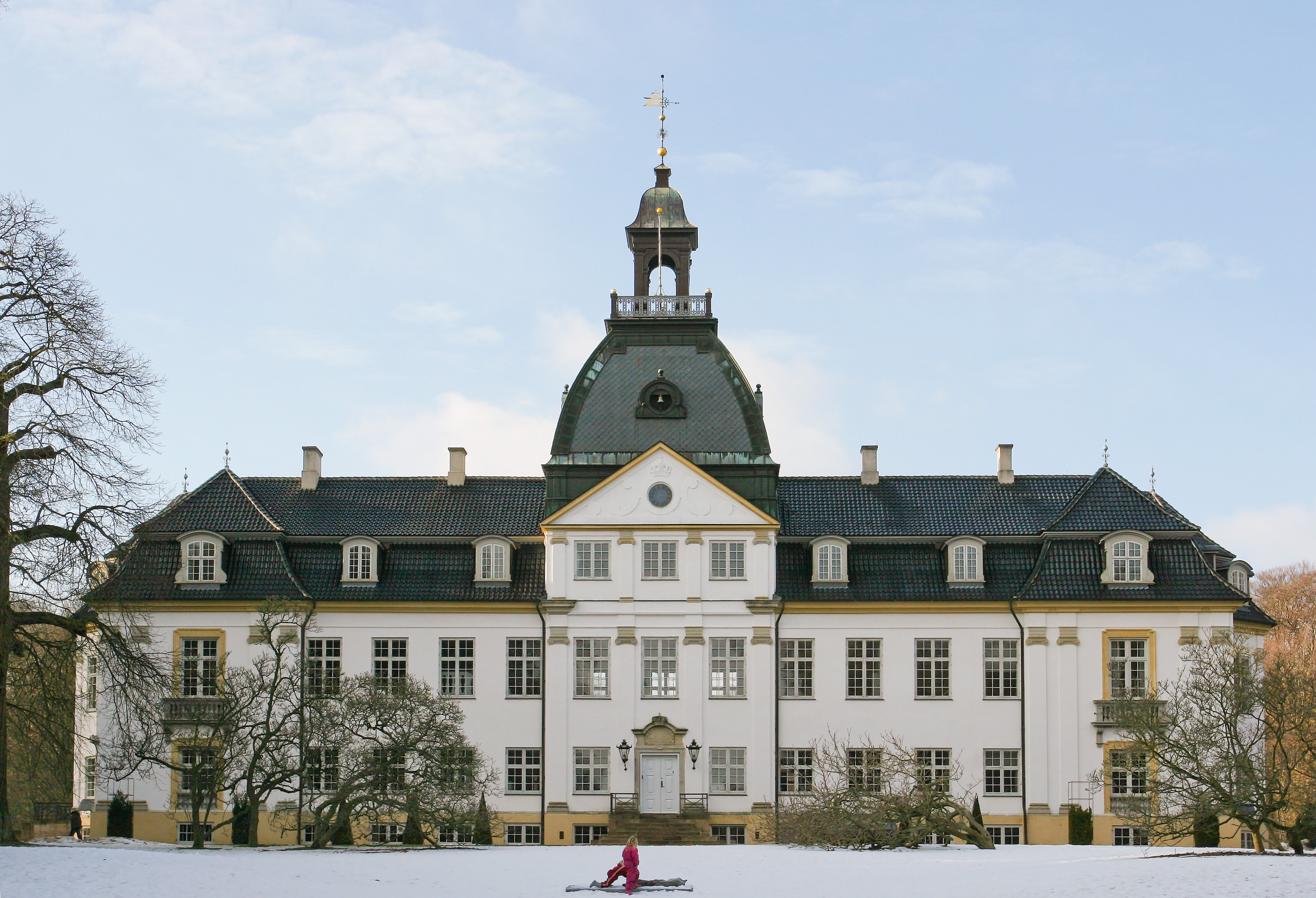
- Charlottenlund Palace in February 2006
- Interactive map of the Charlottenlund Palace area

General information
- Type: Palace
- Architectural style: Baroque, Neo-Renaissance
- Location: Charlottenlund, Denmark
- Construction started: 1731
- Completed: 1881
- Client: Princess Charlotte Amalie of Denmark, Frederick VIII of Denmark

Design and construction
- Architects: Johan Cornelius Krieger, Ferdinand Meldahl

Charlottenlund Palace (Danish: Charlottenlund Slot) is a former summer residence of the Danish royal family located in Charlottenlund, some 10 km (6 mi) north of central Copenhagen, Denmark.

The palace is named after Princess Charlotte Amalie, who was responsible for the construction of the original palace. It was later extended and adapted for Crown Prince Frederick VIII to a design by Ferdinand Meldahl in the early 1880s.

From 1935 to 2017, the building housed the Danish Biological Station (Dansk Biologisk Station), later renamed Danish Fishery Survey and in the final years called DTU Aqua. It is now a cultural event venue. The Great Hall is occasionally used for classical concerts.

== History ==
=== Origins ===
In 1622, King Christian IV established a new deer park at the site, which was to replace Rosenborg Deer Park at Rosenborg Castle just outside Copenhagen. It was referred to variously as "Kongens nye dyrehave ved Skovshoved" ("The King's new deer park at Skovshoved"), "Gentofte dyrehave ved stranden" ("Gentofte deer park by the beach"), "Den lille dyrehave ved Ibstrub" ("The small deer park at Ibstrub") and "Freudendahl".

In 1663, King Frederick III ceded the deer park to one of his courtiers, Jacob Petersen (kammertjener, later rigsbaron). With Henrik Ruse, Petersen opened an inn at the site.

=== Gyldenlund ===
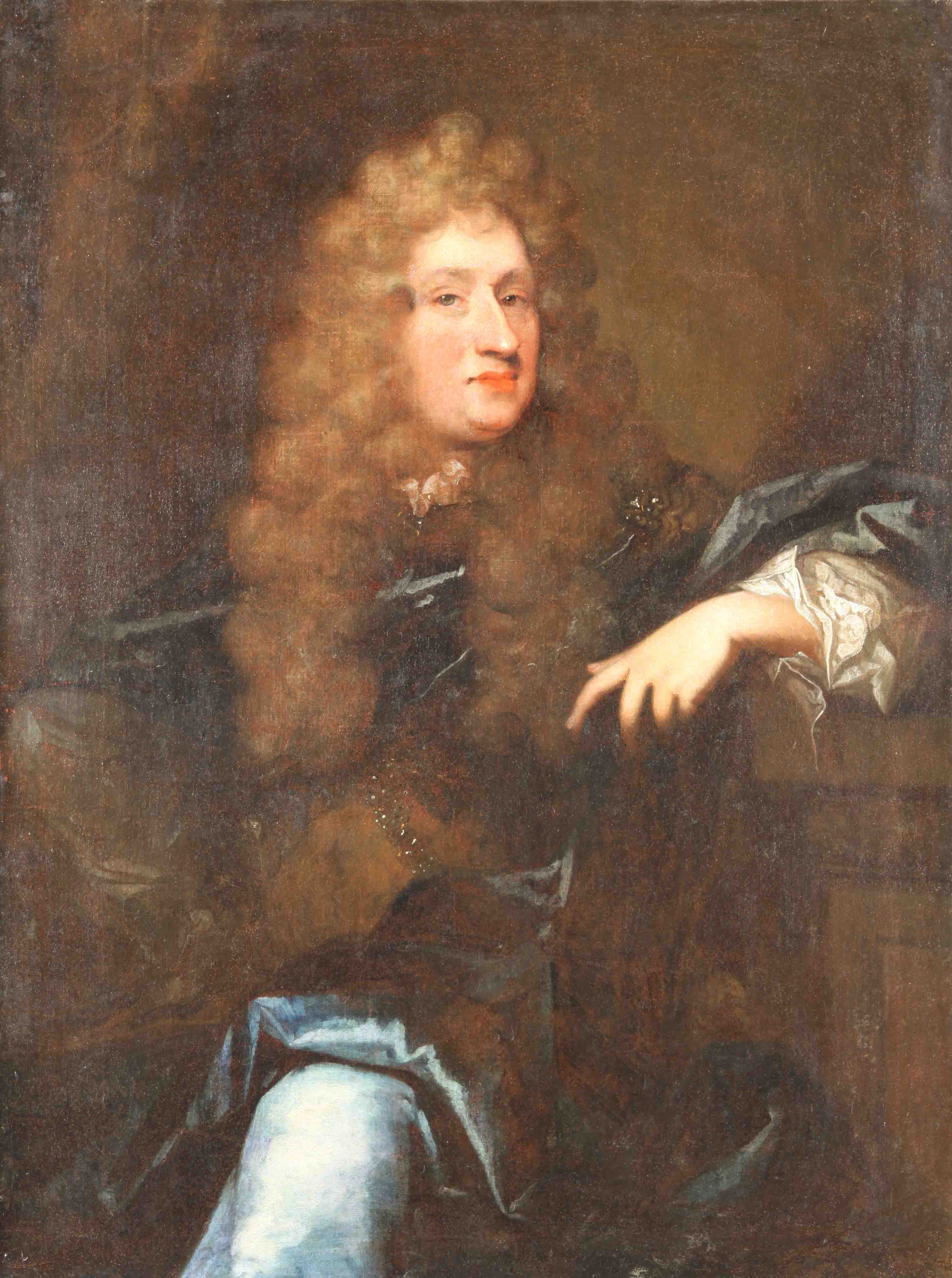
Ulrik Frederik Gyldenløve.

Due to a dispute at the court, Jacob Petersen had to leave the country. His property was then taken over by Ulrik Frederik Gyldenløve, an acknowledged illegitimate son of King Frederick III, and it became known as Gyldenlund after its new owner. He renovated the buildings as well as the fishing ponds and constructed a new summer residence in the grounds. The exact location of the new house is not known but it is assumed that it was located at the site of the current palace.

Gyldenløve had owned Gyldenlund for some ten years when Frederick III claimed it back in exchange for Skjoldenæsholm at Ringsted. The king used the house as a summer retreat and for hunting. Christian V constructed Jægersborg Allé in 1706, originally as a private road, connecting the two royal residences in Charlottenlund and Jægersborg.

=== Charlottenlund ===
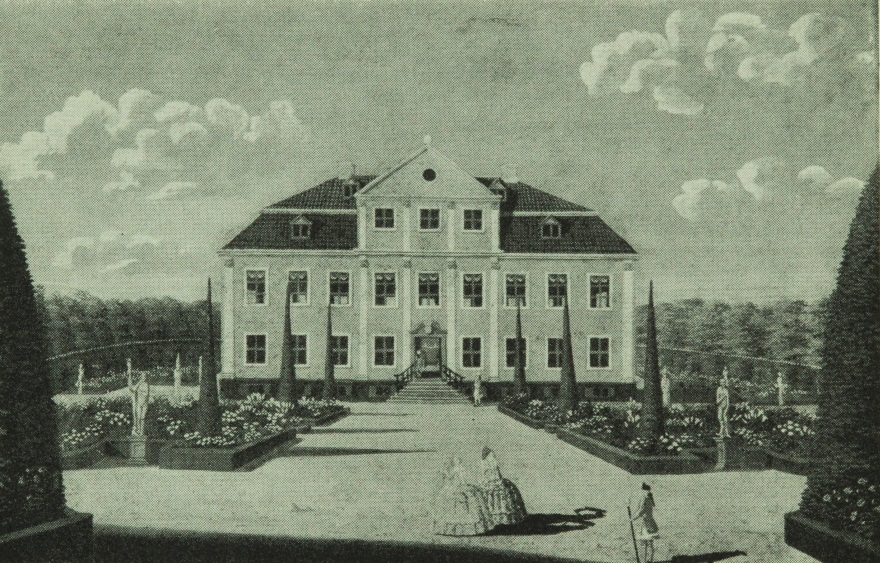
Charlottenlund in 1744

In 1730, Crown Prince Christian (VI) gave Gyldenlund to his sister, Princess Charlotte Amalie. She replaced the house with a new building in the Baroque style. The construction took place under the supervision of Engineer Officer H. H. Scheel, probably to a design by Johan Cornelius Krieger. Many of the building materials came from Copenhagen Castle which was under demolition.

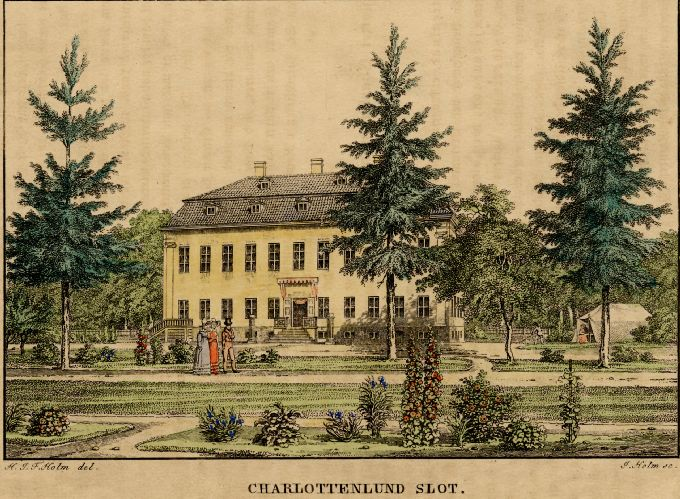
Charlottenlund Palace, drawing by H.G.F. Holm, c. 1830

In the middle of the 19th century, Charlottenlund Palace was for many years the home of Louise Charlotte and Prince William of Hesse-Kassel. Quite atypically for a royal residence, the park remained open to the public. Throughout the century, on and off, it was a favourite excursion spot for Copenhageners on Sundays.

In 1869, Crown Prince Frederick and his wife Lovisa of Sweden took over the palace. Both Christian X of Denmark and Haakon VII of Norway were born in the building. In 1880–81, Ferdinand Meldahl undertook a major rebuilding of the palace. The queen dowager Louise lived there until her death in 1926.

=== Later history ===
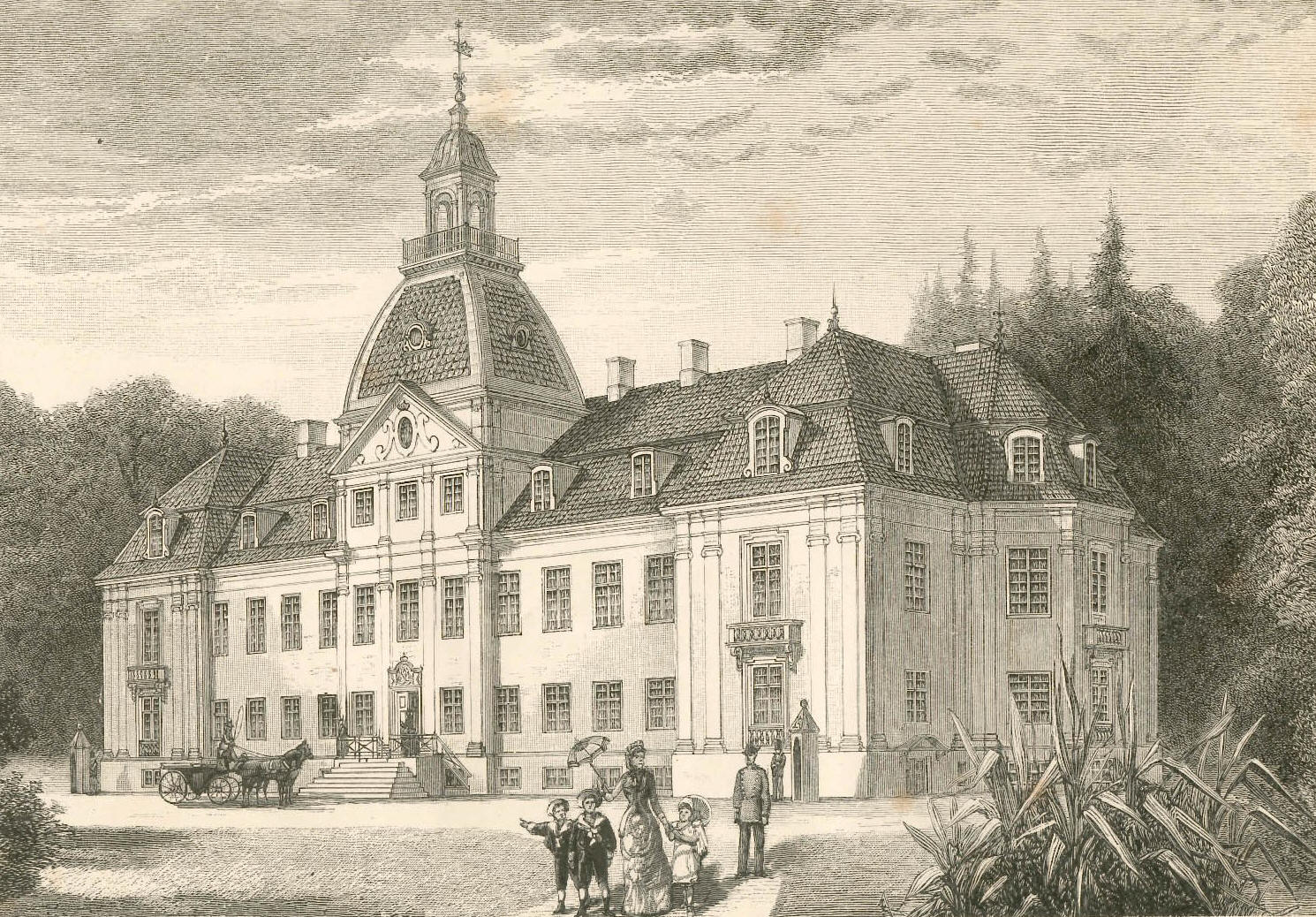
Charlottenlund Palace after the extension, c. 1890

The royal family discontinued using the palace in 1935 and made it available to the Danish Biological Station (Dansk Biologisk Station), later renamed Danish Fishery Survey (Danmarks Fiskeriundersøgelser). The Danish National Aquarium opened in a corner of the park in 1939 where it remained until 2013 when The Blue Planet was inaugurated in Kastrup. The Danish Fishery Survey, now called DTU Aqua, became a department under the Technical University of Denmark (DTU) in 2001. The department planned to move to a new building at DTU's main campus in Lyngby in 2015. The future use of Charlottenlund Palace had not yet been decided as of January 2016. As of 2019, Charlottenlund Palace is being used for caterings as well as office space for a vast number of companies.

== Architecture ==
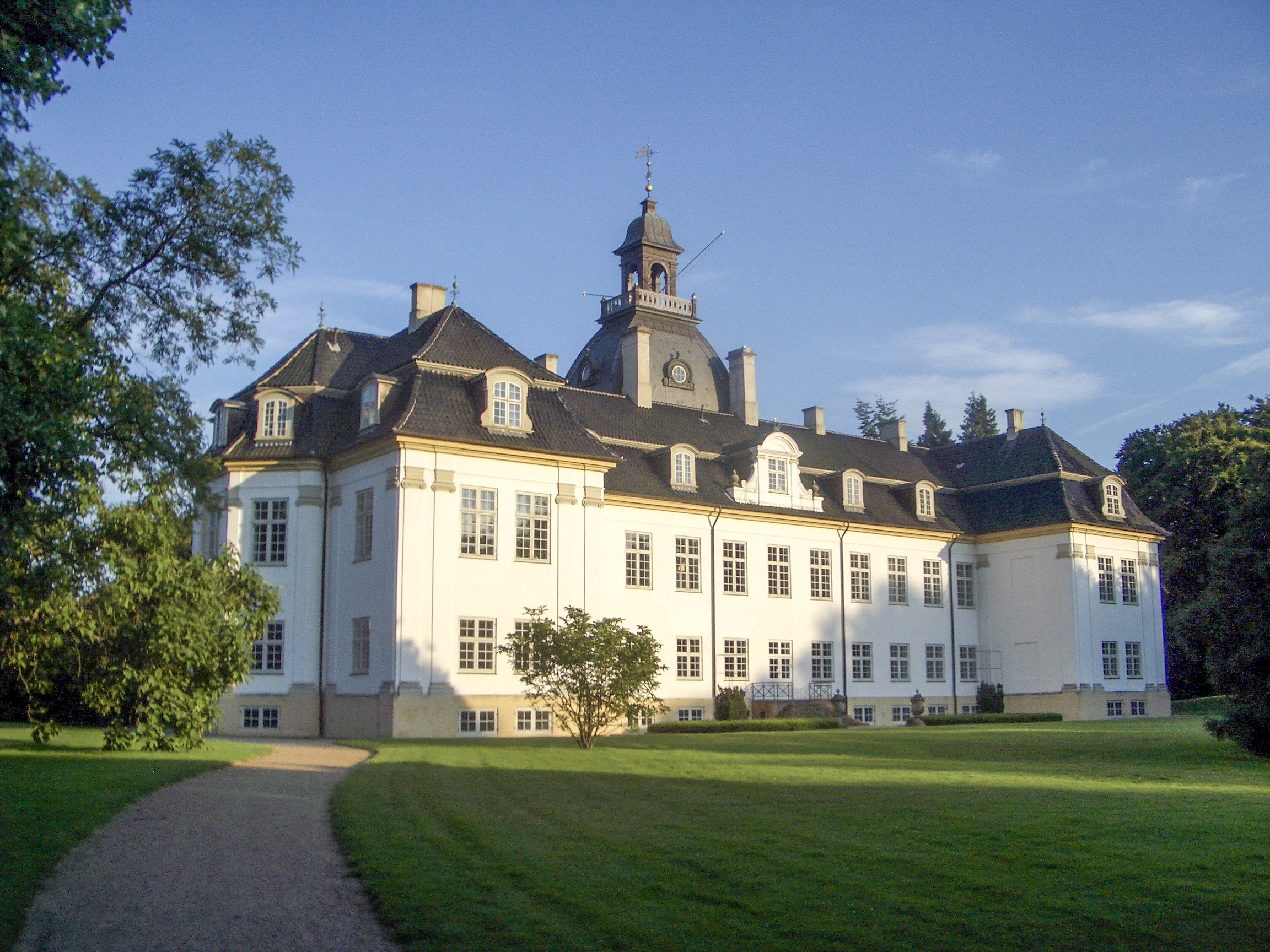
Charlottenlund Palace in August 2007

Meldahl's extension of the palace in the 1880s adapted the original Baroque palace to reflect the French Renaissance style that characterizes its architecture today. Meldahl extended the building with two bays and the two corner risalits on the front side. The central hall with dome and lantern were also added. On the garden side there is a three bay central projection. The building was listed in 1918.

== Park and surroundings ==
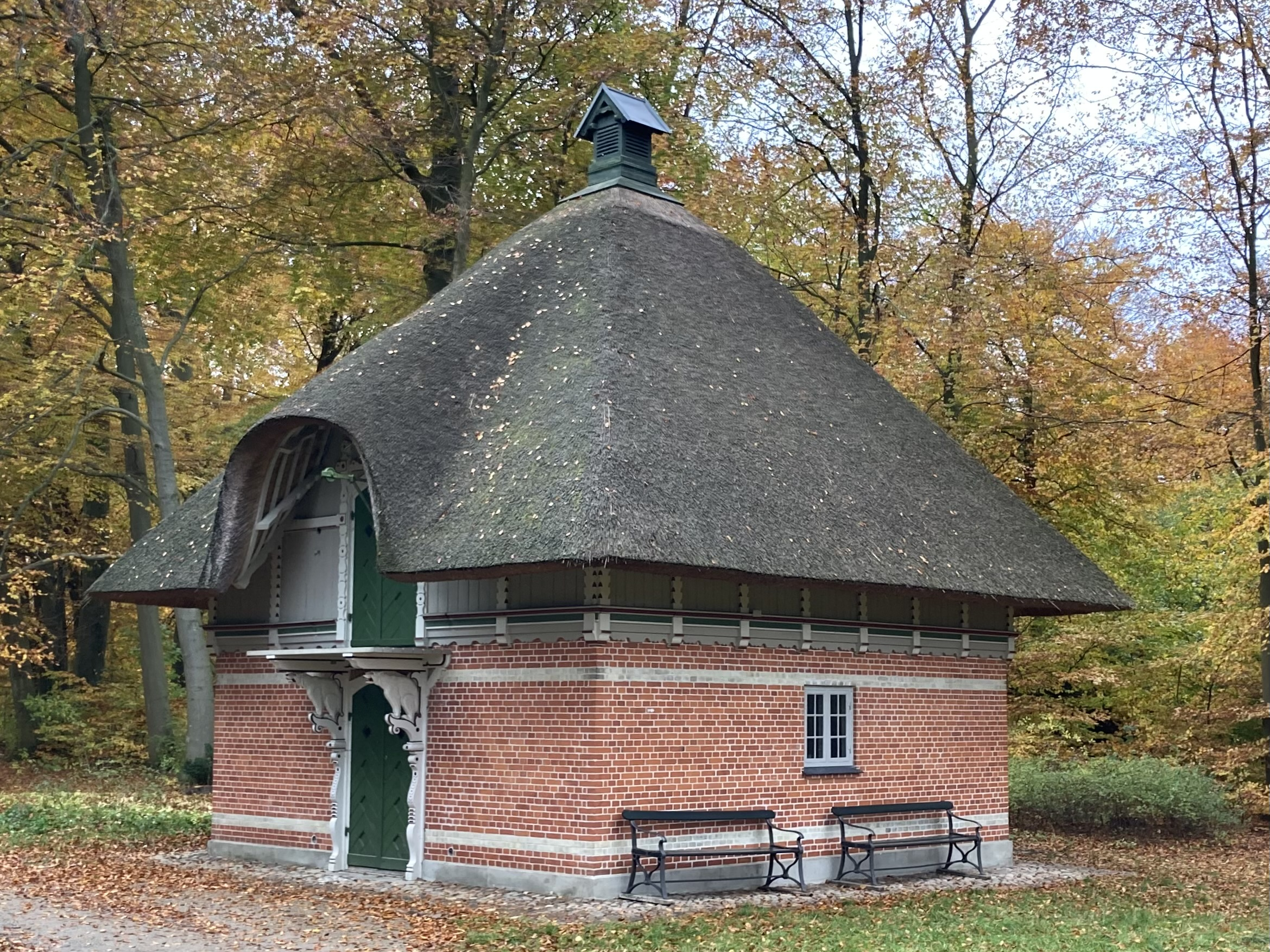
The royal icehouse in the park (built c. 1885)

The park has an area of 14.2 hectares (35.1 acres). The original Baroque park was redesigned into an English-style Romantic garden in the 1880s. It contains several small buildings, including an ice house and a thatched, yellow building with timber framing that has been used both as a wash house and a guard house for the Royal Life Guards.

The park adjoins Charlottenlund Beach Park and Charlottenlund Forest.

== See also ==
- List of Baroque residences
- Charlottenlund
- Charlottenlund station
