= Bitte =

Bitte is a Nordic female given name. Notable people with the name include:

- Bitte Berg (born 1961), Swedish curler
- Bitte Kai Rand (born 1956), Danish fashion designer

== See also ==
- Witte
