= Charlotte Amalie =

Charlotte Amalie may refer to:

- Charlotte Amalie of Hesse-Kassel (or Hesse-Cassel) (1650–1714), queen-consort of Denmark and Norway
- Princess Charlotte Amalie of Denmark (1706–1782), Danish princess, daughter of King Frederick IV
- Charlotte Amalie, U.S. Virgin Islands, the capital city, which was named after the queen-consort
- Charlotte Amalie High School, a high school in the aforementioned city
