= Charlotte Baden =

Danish writer, feminist and letter-writer

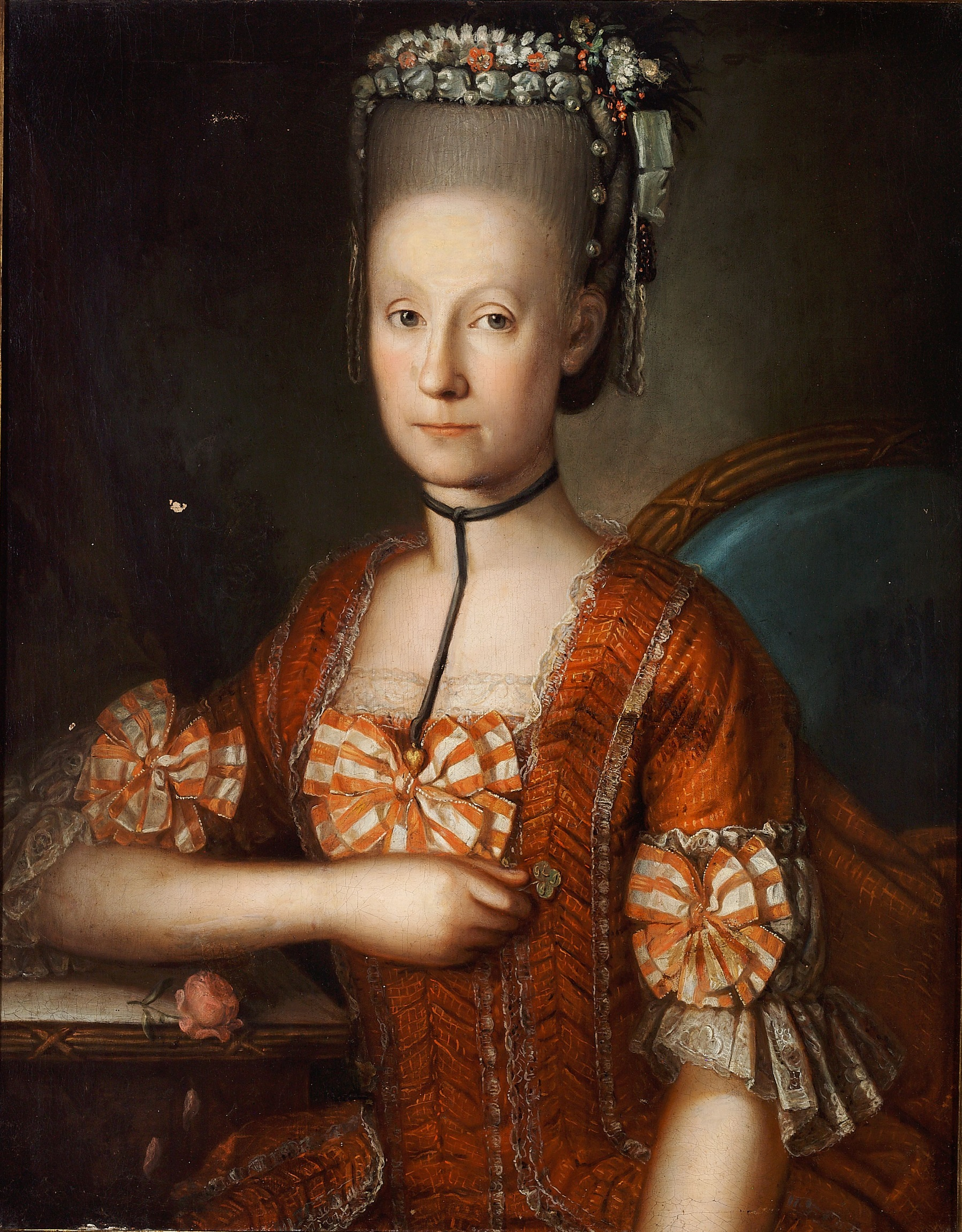
- Charlotte Baden painted by Georg Mathias Fuchs
- Born: Sophia Louise Charlotte von Klenau; November 21, 1740; Copenhagen, Denmark
- Died: June 6, 1824 (aged 83); Copenhagen, Denmark
- Resting place: Church of Our Lady, Copenhagen
- Spouse: Jacob Baden
- Children: 3

Charlotte Baden (21 November 1740, Copenhagen – 6 June 1824, Copenhagen) was a Danish epistolary author and letter-writer. The majority of her work was published in periodicals, and often used a letter format to focus on the inner lives of women.

Baden is credited with established an epistolary literary tradition in Denmark, which was later developed by Thomasine Christine Gyllembourg-Ehrensvärd and Mathilde Fibiger. Today, she is best known for her 1784 epistolary novel Den fortsatte Grandison, which was a continuation of Samuel Richardson’s The History of Sir Charles Grandison.

== Career ==
Baden's career as a writer stemmed from her practice as a letter writer. Her first language was German, and it is speculated that she learned Danish through writing letters. Baden wrote as a correspondent and contributor for the Bibliotek for det smukke Kiøn, a journal which was marketed towards aristocratic women in Copenhagen. In addition to her contributions in the Bibliotek for det smukke Kiøn, Baden was also anonymously published work in Morgen-posten and Birchs Billedgallerie, contributing short stories.

Her most famous work, Den fortsatte Grandison, was first published as a serial in the Bibliotek for det smukke Kiøn in 1783. It was a continuation of Samuel Richardson’s epistolary novel The History of Sir Charles Grandison. Unlike Richardson's version, her addition focused on the role of women by placing the noblewoman Clementia as its protagonist. She gave the women of the story greater agency and treated them as the narrative's driving moral authority. It was only following positive reviews from readers and her editors that the work was published in its entirety in 1792.

== Personal life ==
Sophia Louise Charlotte von Klenau was born on 2 November 1740 in Copenhagen to Major Gustav Ludvig von Klenau (1703–1772) and his wife, Bolette Cathrine From (1696–1788). Her family belonged to the German and Danish nobility of Bohemian descent.

When she was six, her father was stationed in Norway as a first lieutenant and her parents moved to Norway. Charlotte remained in Copenhagen and was instead brought up by her father's relative Anna Susanne von der Osten (1704–1773). Von der Osten was head lady-in-waiting to Princess Charlotte Amalie of Denmark and was able to finance Charlotte's education and arrange for her care. For three and a half years, she resided with the Baroness von Sölenthal, before living at a pension institution in Nyborg for three years where she received a progressive education. She then resided with the Countess Sponneck for five years. When her parents returned to Denmark, Charlotte was about 18 years old and went to live with them.

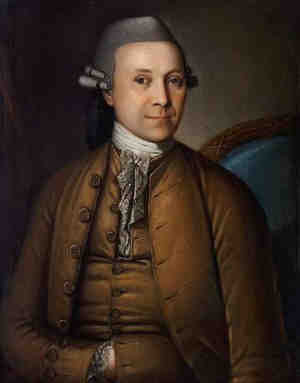
Portrait of Charlotte's husband, Jacob Baden, whom she married in 1763, painted by Georg Mathias Fuchs

On 4 February 1763, she married Jacob Baden, who was a professor at the University of Copenhagen. He often tutored his wife and she participated in some of his lectures on the Danish language. She and her husband had three children: Gustav Ludvig Baden (1764–1831), Torkel Baden (1765–1849), Jacob Baden (1768–1841). Gustav Ludvig became a judge and politician who authored around 75 works; Torkel became a professor of philology at the University of Copenhagen and authored over 100 scientific treatises; and their son Jacob was a lighthouse inspector. Charlotte Baden died on 6 June 1824 and was buried at the Church of Our Lady in Copenhagen.
