= National Aquarium Denmark =

National Aquarium Denmark, Den Blå Planet

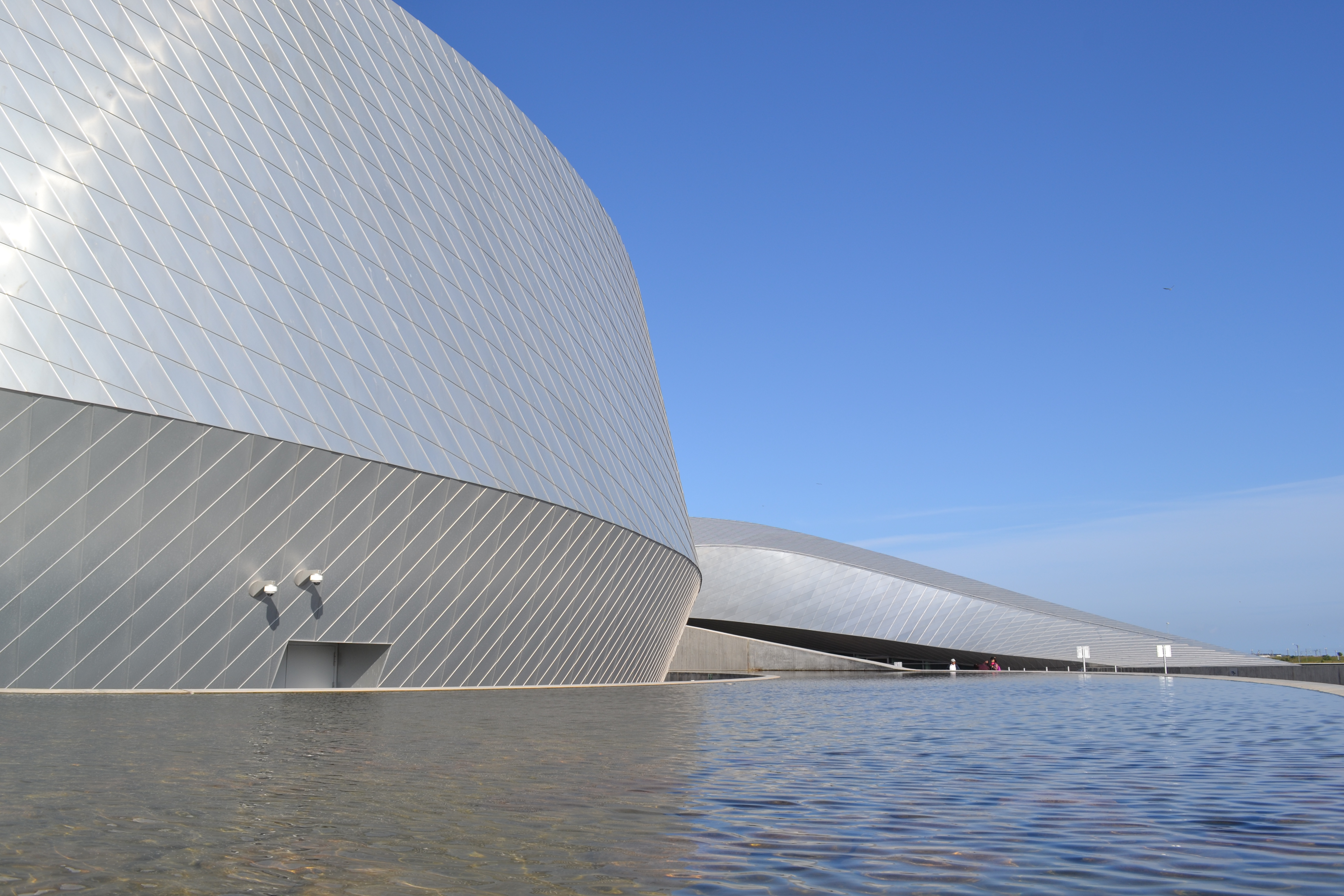
- Interactive map of National Aquarium Denmark, Den Blå Planet
- 55.638°N 12.656°E
- Date opened: 1939 (aquarium in Charlottenlund). 2013 (aquarium in Kastrup).
- Location: Kastrup, Copenhagen, Denmark
- Land area: 12,000 m^{2} (130,000 sq ft)
- No. of animals: 20,000
- No. of species: 450
- Volume of largest tank: 4,000,000 L (880,000 imp gal; 1,100,000 US gal)
- Total volume of tanks: 7,000,000 L (1,500,000 imp gal; 1,800,000 US gal)
- Website: denblaaplanet.dk/en

National Aquarium Denmark, Den Blå Planet (Danish: Den Blå Planet, Danmarks Akvarium) is a public aquarium in Denmark. The original aquarium was located in Charlottenlund, but this facility closed in 2012 and most of the animal collection was relocated to the new and much larger aquarium Den Blå Planet (lit.: The Blue Planet) in Kastrup, a suburb of Copenhagen. The National Aquarium Denmark, Den Blå Planet opened to the public in March 2013 and is the largest aquarium in Northern Europe.

The main purpose of the aquarium is to disseminate marine information, help science projects, and help improve educational institutions.

== The former aquarium ==
Denmark's Aquarium in Charlottenlund started construction in 1937 and was opened in 1939. In 1974, this aquarium was expanded to feature five large landscape aquaria and a biological museum with theme-based exhibits and aquariums. In 1990, the facility was further expanded by a new front hall, café, improved toilet facilities and a schooler service. In the final years before the closure of the aquarium in Charlottenlund, it had about 1,000,000 litres (220,000 imp gal; 260,000 US gal) of water in about 70 aquarium tanks. Denmark's Aquarium remains internationally familiar thanks to its central role in the Danish-American film Reptilicus, which was partly shot there in 1960.

== Current aquarium ==
Den Blå Planet opened in 2013 in Kastrup, a suburb of Copenhagen. It resembles a whirlpool when seen from above; it often is, being close to the Copenhagen Airport. It was designed by Danish architects 3XN. To reduce energy consumption the building is equipped with cooling units using seawater from Øresund and double glazing. It covers a total of 12,000 m^{2} (130,000 sq ft), including the 10,000 m^{2} (110,000 sq ft) building and 2,000 m^{2} (22,000 sq ft) outdoors (excluding parking spaces).

In the first year of existence, the aquarium received approximately 1.3 million visitors – twice as many as expected. To mitigate this extra wear, and in order to improve public education, 12.5 million DKK (approx. 2.3 million US$; 1.7 million €) were spent on changes and renovations of the aquarium.

The Blue Planet contains about 7,000,000 litres (1,500,000 imp gal; 1,800,000 US gal) of water divided into 53 exhibits. There are five main sections:

The Rainforest
The rainforest section is home to arapaimas, arowanas, pacus, freshwater stingrays, large catfish, boa constrictors, violet turaco and more. This section also has an aquarium with a big school–about 3,000–of piranhas. Near the rainforest is the smaller grotto section, with aquaria for cave tetra, various electric fish (electric eel and elephantfish) and other fish found in dark freshwater habitats.

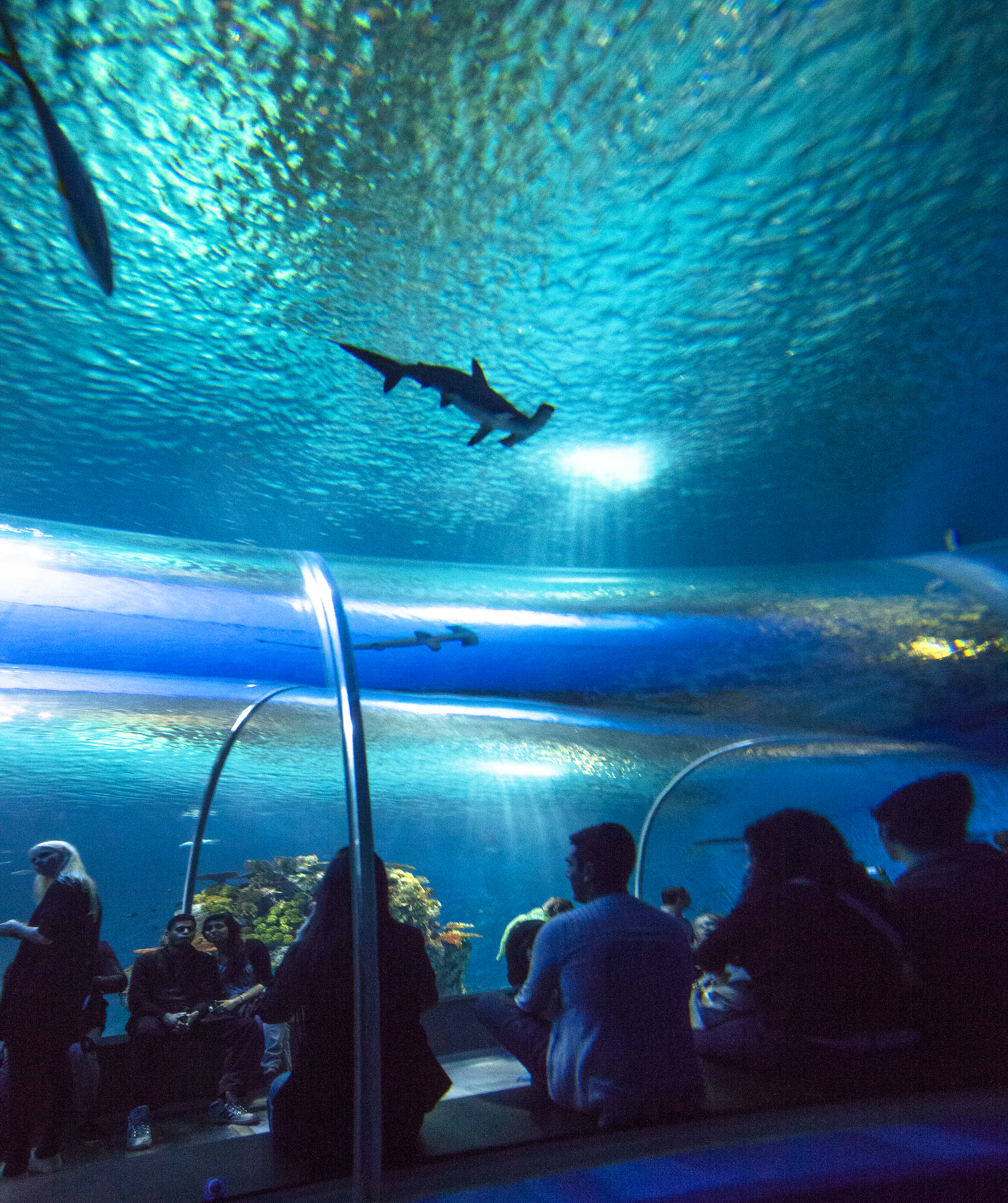
Hammerhead shark and shark tunnel in the Ocean Tank

The African Great Lakes
Exhibits for Lake Malawi, Lake Tanganyika and Lake Victoria. Primarily aimed at cichlids, but also home to large predatory fish such as tigerfish and bichirs.

Evolution and adaption
Aimed at fish evolution and adaption, and contains a mangrove aquarium with four-eyed fish, archerfish, mudskippers and alike, as well as aquaria for Alligator snapping turtle and primitive fish such as gar and lungfish.

Cold Water
Primarily home to native Danish species from fresh- and saltwater. Among others, it includes a touch pool, and a large North Atlantic aquarium with a 15 m (49 ft) tall seabird cliff, which is home to cod, wolffish, conger, puffin and other species. Non-native species in or near the Cold Water section are giant Pacific octopus, sea anemones and more. This section also housed California sea lions for a period (their previous home, Bergen Aquarium in Norway was being renovated). In early 2014 they were moved to a permanent home at La Palmyre Zoo, France. Following modifications, a pair of sea otters moved into the former sea lion exhibit in October 2014, making the aquarium one of only four places where this species can be seen in Europe (the others being Lisbon Oceanarium in Portugal; Oceanopolis in Brest, France; and the National Sea Life Centre in Birmingham, England.)

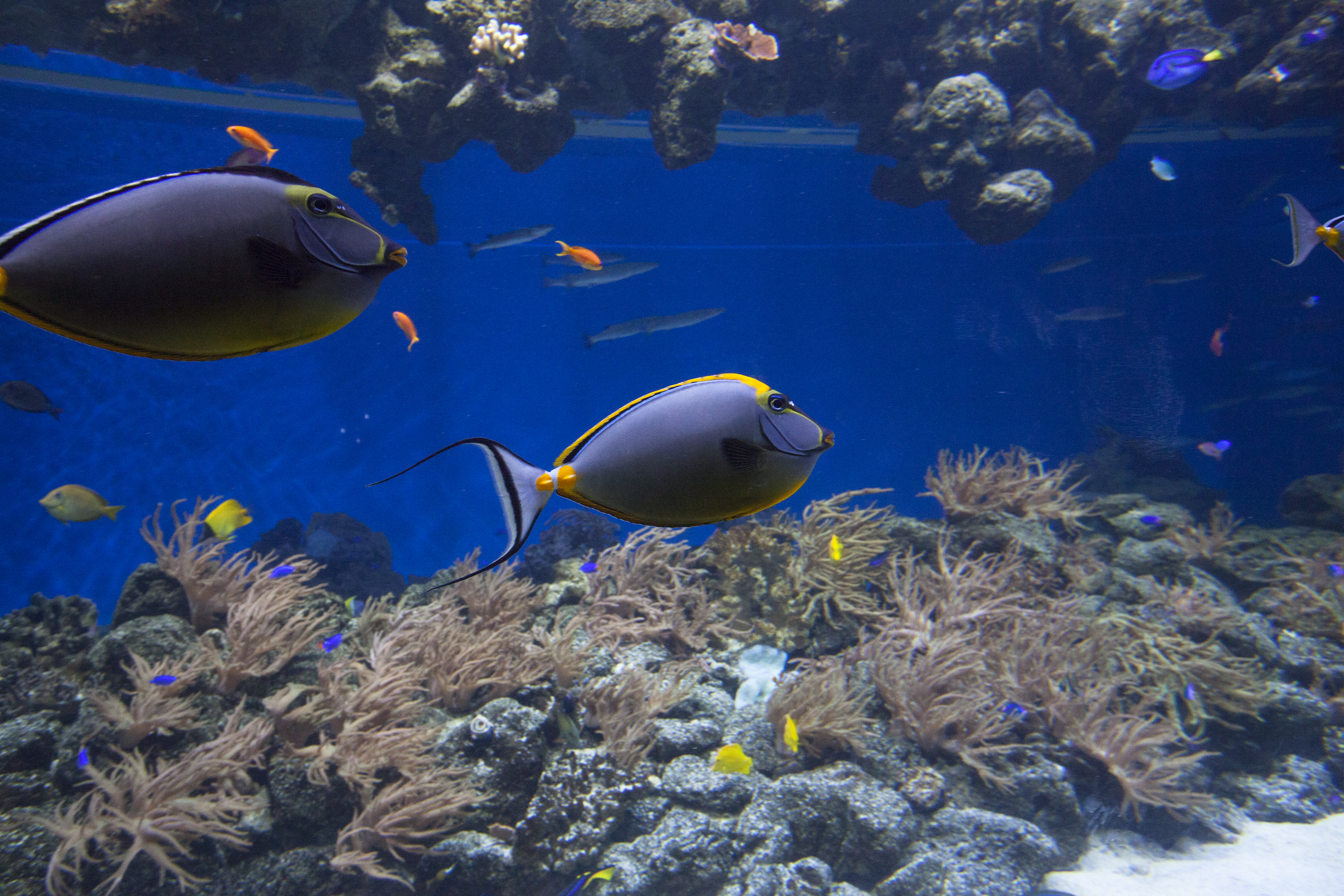
Coral reef fish

The Warm Ocean
This section contains the largest aquarium in Blue Planet, the 4,000,000-litre (880,000 imp gal; 1,100,000 US gal) Ocean tank. It is home to sharks (zebra shark, blacktip reef shark, wobbegongs and scalloped hammerheads), stingrays, eagle rays, guitarfish, moray eels, golden trevallies, groupers and more that can be seen through the 16 by 8 m (52 by 26 ft) main window, which is 45 cm (18 in) thick. There is also a 16 m (52 ft) long shark tunnel. Opposite the Ocean Tank is the 16 m (52 ft) long coral reef with living corals and reef fish. There are also various smaller aquaria with species such as shrimpfish, seahorses, a Mediterranean aquarium, and the highly venomous stonefish and lionfish.
