= Heinrich Meldahl =

Norwegian architect (1776–1840)

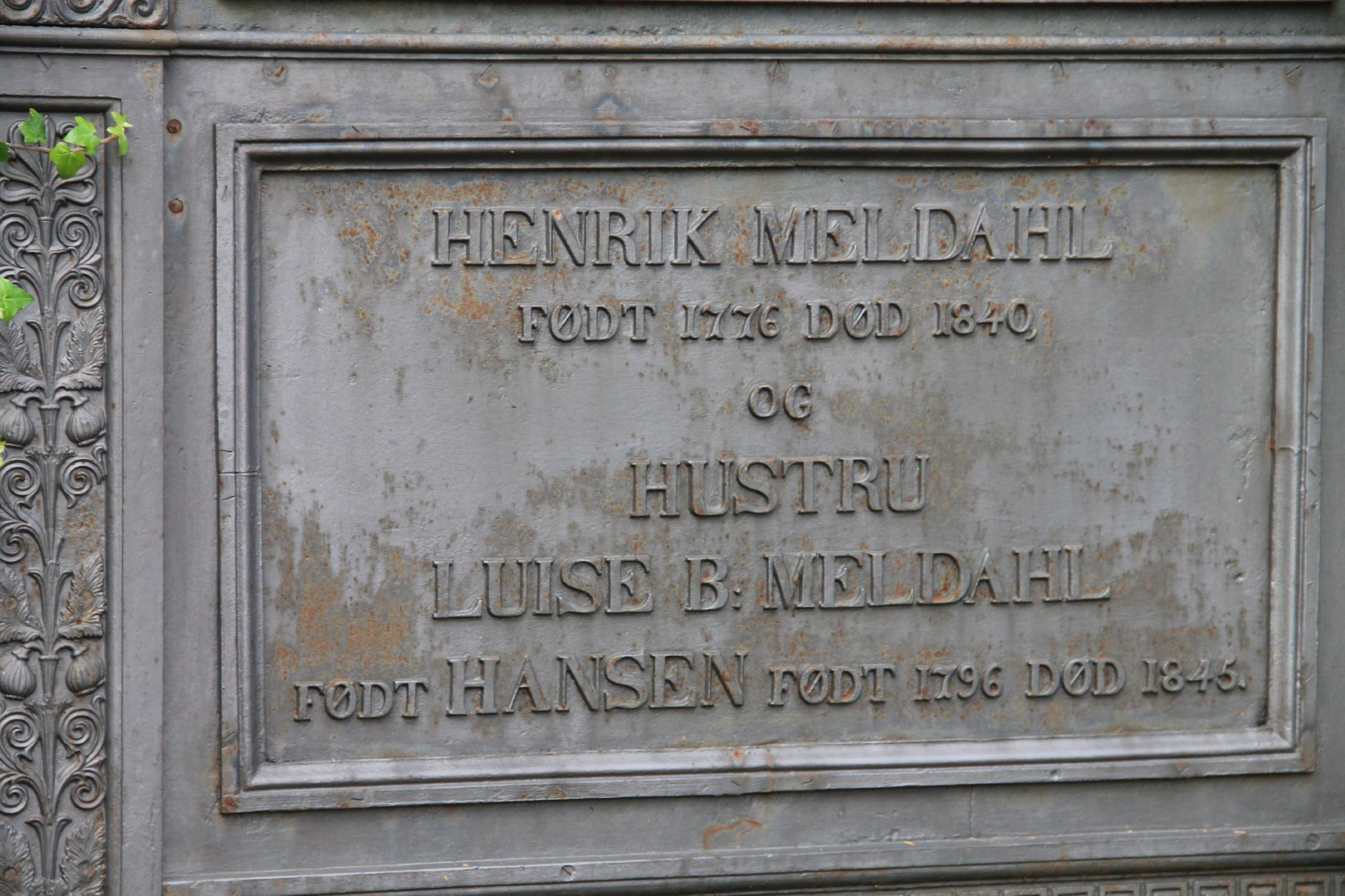
Tomb of Henrik Meldahl at Frederiksberg Old Cemetery in Frederiksberg, Copenhagen.

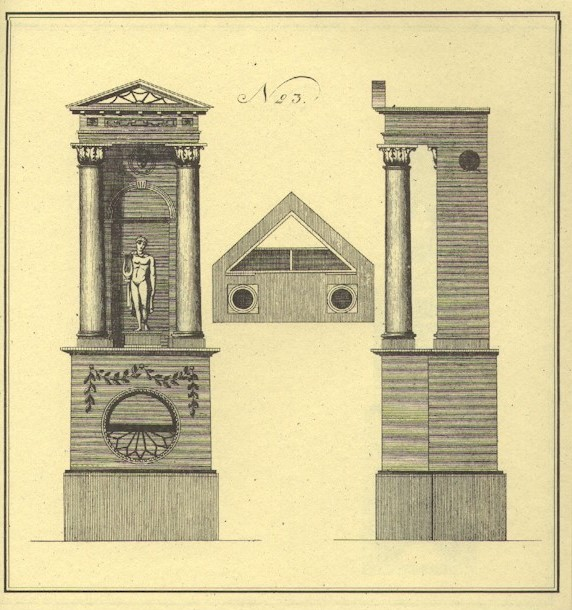
Design for heating stove for Næs jernverk by Henrik Meldahl. circa 1806

Heinrich Meldahl (8 September 1776 – 24 February 1840) was a Danish industrial designer, architect and the owner of an iron foundry.

== Early life ==
Heinrich Joachim Meldahl was born in Copenhagen, Denmark. He was the son of Christen Larsen Meldahl (ca. 1742-1782) and Cathrine Wendorf (1742-1807).

== Career ==
From 1804, Meldahl was employed as a designer and operating engineer by Jacob Aall at the Næs jernverk in Aust-Agder, Norway. It was his task to lead production and deliver drawings to new product models. From 1806–07, Meldahl returned to Copenhagen for further education in drawing.

In 1811, he returned to Denmark, where he was granted permission to establish an iron foundry at Vesterbro. Production included agricultural tools including plows and harrows as well as stoves and ovens similar to those from Næs.

== Personal life ==
He was married to Benedicte Louise Hansen (1796- 1845) and was the father of Danish architect Ferdinand Meldahl (1827-1908) and army officer General Carl Edvard Meldahl.
