= Charlottenlund Beach Park =

Public park in Charlottenlund, Copenhagen, Denmark

Charlottenlund Strandpark
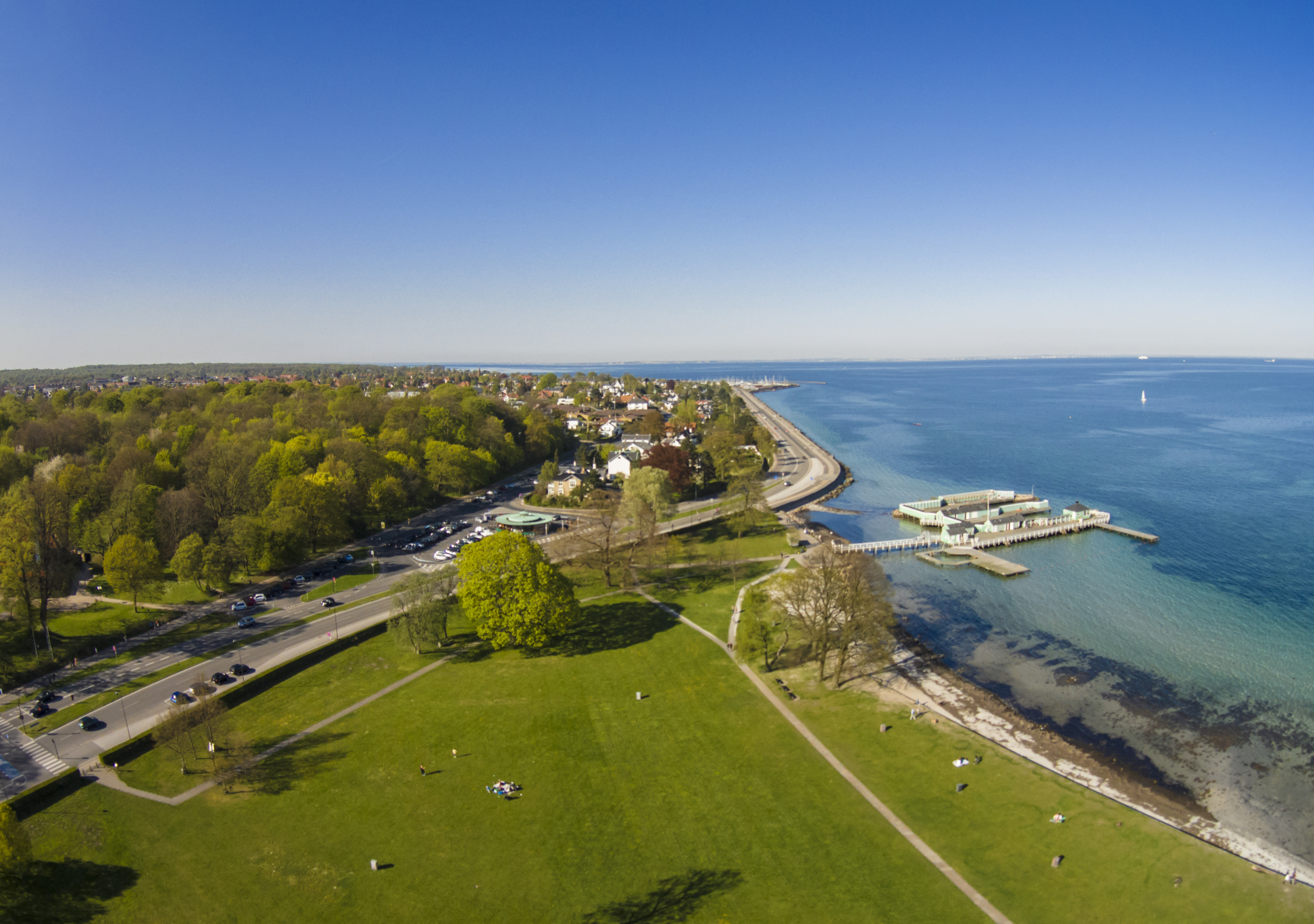
- Interactive map of Charlottenlund Strandpark
- Location: Charlottenlund, Copenhagen, Denmark
- Coordinates: 55°44′42″N 12°35′13″E
- Area: 13.1 hectares (32 acres)
- Created: 1932
- Status: Open all year

Charlottenlund Beach Park (Danish: Charlottenlund Strand Strandpark) is a seaside public park in Charlottenlund, Gentofte Municipality, in the northern suburbs of Copenhagen, Denmark. The area consists of a white sandy beach and extensive lawns, surrounding Charlottenlund Fort.

== History ==
The park's history as a green space dates back to 1622 when King Christian IV established "Gentofte Deer Park by the Beach" (Gentofte Dyrehave ved Stranden). The area later came under "Gyldenlund", what is now called Charlottenlund Slot.

In 1886 the southern part of the area was ceded to the Ministry of Defence when Charlottenlund Fort as part of Copenhagen's new defense towards the sea. The area to the north was leased to Frederick VIII who leveled it and used it as a vegetable garden.

The area came into use as a public beach park in 1932. In 1950 the park was refurbished to designs by Aksel Andersen, who served as head of the municipal park department from 1946 until his death in 1953.

== Facilities ==
The beach park has toilets, a kiosk and a restaurant on the former ramparts of the fortress.

The camp site has room for tents, caravans and mobile homes but no cabins are available. It has modern bathrooms, kitchen facilities, dining room and a launderette.

== See also ==
- Cottaggeparken
