= Charlottenlund =

Suburb of Copenhagen, Denmark

Coordinates: 55°45′02″N 12°33′07″E

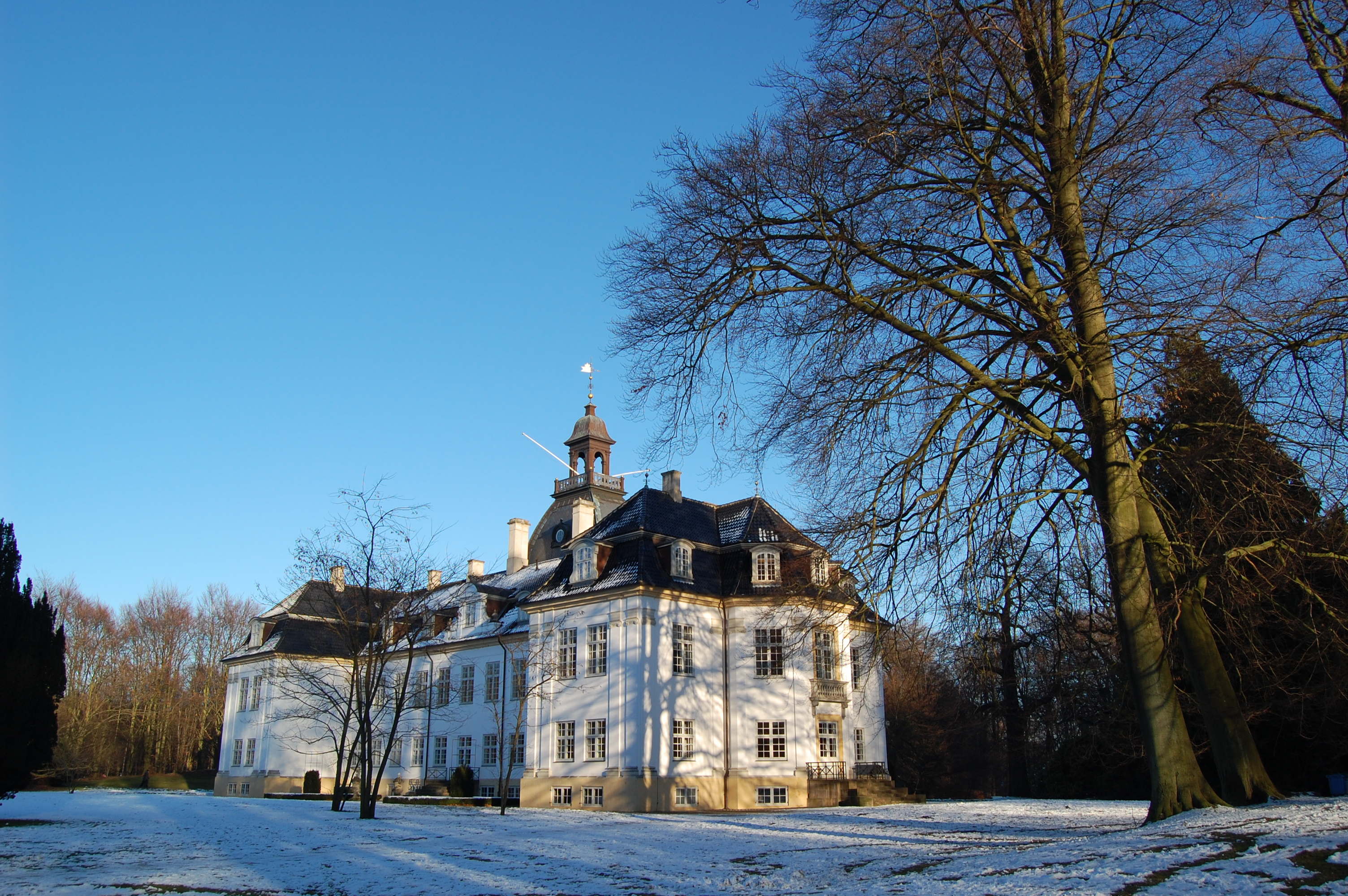
Charlottenlund Palace in the winter time

Charlottenlund is a suburban area on the coast north of Copenhagen, Denmark. It is the administrative seat of Gentofte Municipality. Bordered to the east by the Øresund, to the South by Hellerup and to the north by Klampenborg, it is one of the wealthiest areas in Denmark. The neighbourhood takes its name after Charlottenlund Palace.

== History ==
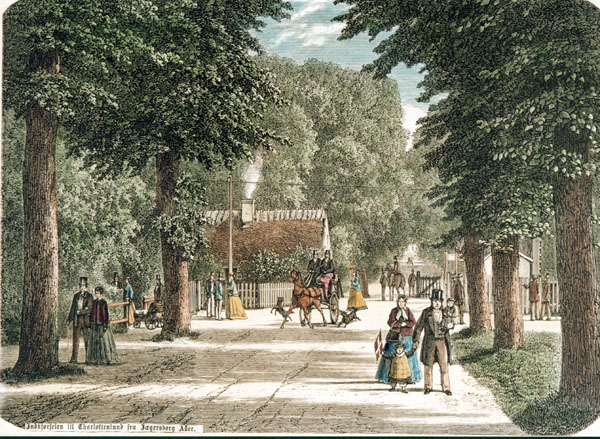
A scene from Charlottenlund Forest

In 1733, King Christian VI of Denmark rebuilt the Gyldenlund Palace, renaming it Charlottenlund Palace after his sister Princess Charlotte Amalie.

In the 19th century, it became popular with the bourgeoisie in Copenhagen to make excursions to the countryside north of the city. Charlottenlund Forest was a popular destination.

The postal code of Charlottenlund is 2920.

== Schools ==
Ordrup Gymnasium

== Culture and recreation ==
Local landmarks include Charlottenlund Palace and Gentofte Town Hall.

The Ordrupgaard Museum boasts collections of Danish and French art from the 19th and beginning of the 20th century.

Charlottenlund Fort is located in Charlottenlund Beach Park. It houses a popular camp site. The beach park and the adjacent Charlottenlund Forest forms the largest green space in Gentofte Municipality. Charlottenlund Racetrack is situated just north of Charlottenlund Forest, and has weekly harness races. Most horses and jockeys are from Denmark, but several times every year the track hosts international events, with entries from Europe and North America.

== Notable people ==
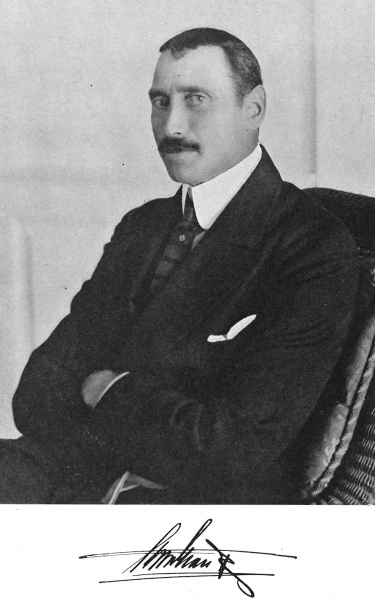
King Christian X, 1910

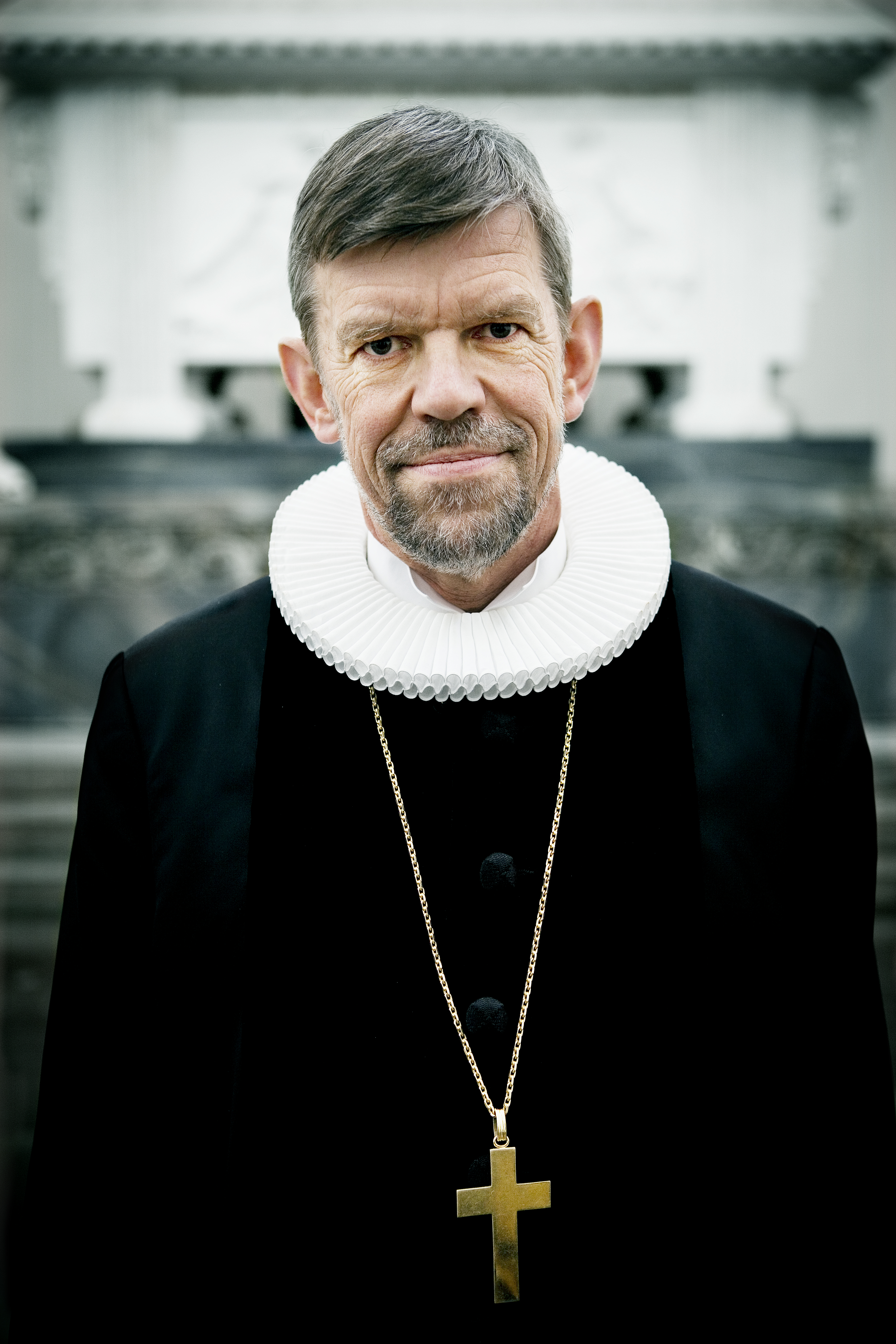
Peter Fischer-Møller, 2010

=== Public Service ===
- Ernst Heinrich, Baron von Schimmelmann (1747–1831) was a German-Danish politician, businessman and patron of the arts; eponym of Schimmelmannsvej in Charlottenlund
- Thomas Arboe (1837 – 1917 in Charlottenlund) architect
- Christian X of Denmark (1870 Charlottenlund Palace – 1947) King of Denmark from 1912/1947
- Princess Dagmar of Denmark (1890 in Charlottenlund Palace – 1961) was the youngest child and fourth daughter of Frederick VIII of Denmark
- Tine Susanne Miksch Roed (born 1964) deputy director-general at the Confederation of Danish Industry, lives in Charlottenlund
- Sabine Auken (born 1965) German bridge player, lives in Charlottenlund
- Peter Fischer-Møller (born 1955 in Charlottenlund) prelate, Bishop of Roskilde

=== The Arts ===
- Carl Ewald (1856 – 1908 in Charlottenlund) novelist and satirist known for his fairy tales.
- Johannes Hauerslev (1860 – 1921 in Charlottenlund) photographer of street scenes and buildings in Copenhagen
- Ruth Berlau (1906 in Charlottenlund – 1974) actress, director, photographer and writer; collaborated with Bertolt Brecht
- Axel Strøbye (1928 – 2005 in Charlottenlund) stage and film actor
- Anne Marie Helger (born 1946 in Charlottenlund) actress in theatre, films and TV
- Bitte Kai Rand (born 1956) fashion designer for mature women; brought up in Charlottenlund
- Claus Norreen (born 1970 in Charlottenlund) musician and record producer, in the band Aqua
- Catharina Svensson (born 1982 in Charlottenlund) lawyer, a professional equestrienne, model and beauty queen; Miss Earth 2001
- Stephania Potalivo (born 1986 in Charlottenlund) actress and former child star

=== Sports ===
- Holger Rune (born 2003) a tennis player

=== Other ===
- Helle Crafts (1947-1986) a Danish-born American murder victim

== See also ==
- Charlottenlund railway station
- Privathospitalet Danmark
- da:Charlottenlund Fort
- Bernstorff Palace
- Jægersborg Allé
- da:Ordrupvej
- Rydhave (Charlottenlund)
