= Børge Monberg =

Danish field hockey player

Børge Kjær Monberg (August 24, 1905 – June 19, 1990) was a Danish field hockey player who competed in the 1928 Summer Olympics.

He was born in Jægersborg, Gentofte and died in Kalundborg.

In 1928 he was a member of the Danish team which was eliminated in the first round of the Olympic tournament after two wins and two losses. He played all four matches as back.
