= Anna Susanne von der Osten =

Danish courtier and philanthropist

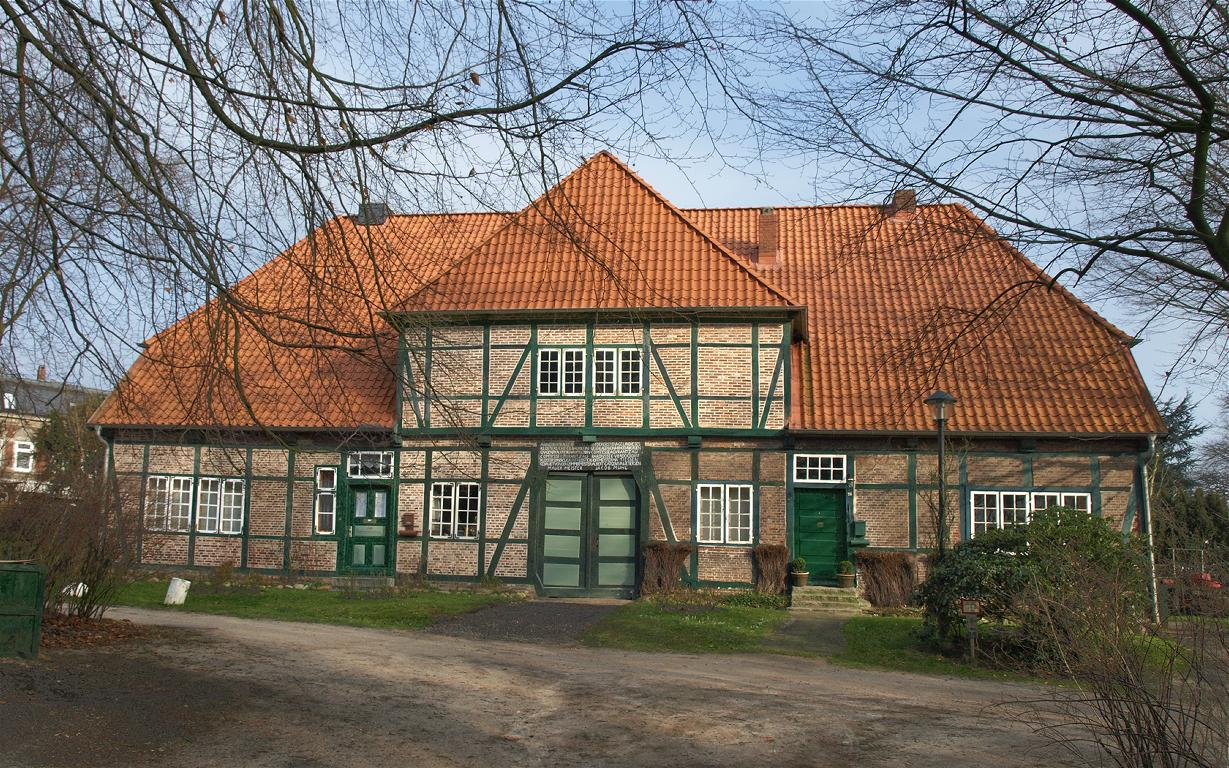
Kloster Uetersen

Anna Susanne von der Osten (4 February 1704- 1 May 1773) was a Danish courtier and philanthropist.

She was the daughter of German-Danish General Lieutenant Christian Georg von der Osten (1674-1735) and Anna Dorothea Gjedde. From 1720-36, she was a maid-of-honour (hoffröken) and from 1736-70 Chief Court Mistress (overhofmesterinde) to Princess Charlotte Amalie of Denmark. She was given the Ordenen de l'Union Parfaite in 1737. To be given this order was common for a lady-in-waiting, but unusual for her, because she was unmarried - the order was usually given to a former maid-of-honour after marriage.

She was the foster mother of Charlotte Baden (1740–1824) and introduced her to her future benefactor Charlotte Amalie. Anna Susanne von den Osten was unmarried and a member of Kloster Uetersen, the Lutheran convent at Uetersen in Schleswig-Holstein. In 1770, she created the Foundation to the Support of Noble Maidens (Stiftelse til adelige Frøkeners Underhold), later known as Den von Ostenske Stiftelse, to support Lutheran spinsters from the nobility with no other support.
