= Chr. Olesen & Co. =

Chr. Olesen
- Company type: Private limited company
- Industry: Food, feed and pharma
- Founded: 1885
- Founder: Christian Olesen
- Headquarters: Gentofte, Copenhagen, Denmark
- Key people: Mads Christian Olesen (CEO)
- Products: Ingredients
- Revenue: DKK 1.58 billion (2015)
- Website: chr-olesen.dk

Chr. Olesen A/S is a multinational manufacturer and distributor of ingredients for the animal feed, food and pharmaceutical industries based in Copenhagen, Denmark.

== History ==
The company traces its history back to 1885 when Christian Olesen opened a store in Vendsyssel in the far north of Jutland. The company later moved to Copenhagen where it is now located at Jægersborg Allé 164 in Gentofte. It is now run by fourth-generation members of the family.

In 2010, ingredients for animal feed accounted for 67% of the company's revenue, while the food industry accounted for 13%.

== Operations ==
Chr. Olesen A/S distributes ingredients for animal feed, food and the pharmaceutical products such as vitamins, amino acids, minerals and antioxidants.

Chr. Olesen Synthesis is the manufacturing arm of the company. It specializes in developing, manufacturing and registration of wet chemical synthesis products such as hydromorphone, pramipexole, codeine phosphate, terbinafine risedronate, tolfenamic acid, amphetamine derivatives and advanced intermediates for buprenorphine and tamsulosin.
