= Louise Wright (activist) =

Danish philanthropist, feminist and peace activist

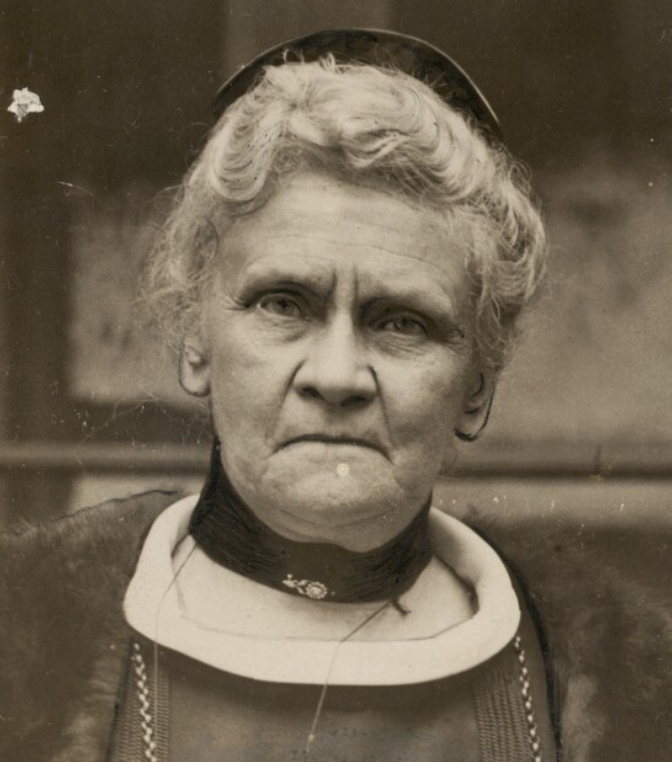
Louise Wright

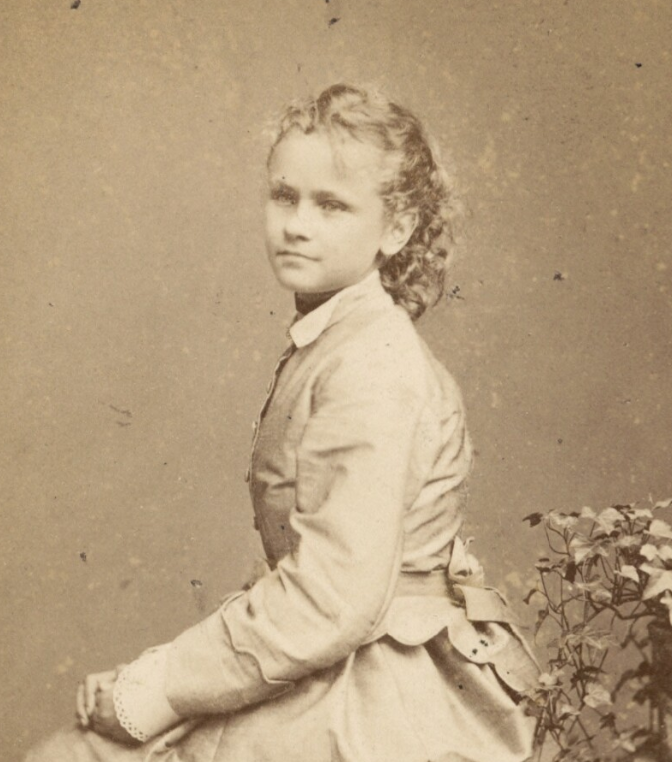
Louise Wright when young (1873)

Louise Gustave Dorothea Hildegard Wright née Bauditz (1861–1935) was a Danish philanthropist, feminist and peace activist. From 1913, she headed the philanthropic Præmieselskabet for Plejemødre, an association for foster mothers which supervised over 600 foster children. She was also an active member of Danske Kvinders Nationalråd (the National Women's Council) where she served as vice-president. In 1915, she was one of the founding members of the Danske Kvinders Fredskæde, the Danish chapter of the Women's International League for Peace and Freedom, serving as a board member (1921–1924).

== Early life and family ==
Born on 30 January 1861 in Fleckeby, Schleswig, Louise Gustave Dorothea Hildegard Bauditz was the daughter of the Carl Adolph Valentin Bauditz (1810–1895) and Elisabeth Carlsen (1838-1902). When she was three years old, as a result of the Second Schleswig War, the family moved to Helsingør where the father headed an old people's home. When she was 15, she met Hans Beck Wright (1854–1925) at a ball. They married in 1886.

== Professional life ==
Wright's primary interest was philanthropic. In 1913, she became director of the Præmieselskabet for Plejemødre, a society for working mothers, supervising over 600 Copenhagen foster children under the age of five, She remained in the post for the rest of her life. In 1911, she became a member of Danske Kvinders Nationalråd (DKN)'s press committee and in 1914 she joined the board of Foreningen Mødres og Børns Bespisning, an association for the welfare of single mothers with children.

As Wright was a native of Southern Jutland, with the outbreak of the First World War in 1914, she headed Flensborg-Samfundet (the Flensburg Society) in the hope that the former Danish territories would be returned to Denmark. The following year, she joined Danske Kvinders Fredskæde, the Danish chapter of the newly established Women’s International League for Peace and Freedom. She was active in managing the Danish chapter where she served on the board from 1921 to 1924 and later became an honorary member.

Thanks to her support for the Danes in Southern Jutland, following reunification in 1920, as head of the Flensburg Society she travelled to Germany each summer with Hanne Jenssen to provide encouragement for the Danes living in Southern Schleswig. She also became an honorary member of Den Sydslesvigske Kvindeforening, the South Schlesvig Women's Association.

In the 1930s, Wright initiated a women's association for assisting the funding of a church in Jægersborg.

After she lost her husband in 1925, Louise Wright spent the rest of her life together with her daughter Lissie in Jægersborg. She died in Gentofte on 15 April 1935.

== See also ==
- List of peace activists
