= Jacob Baden =

Danish linguist (1735–1804)

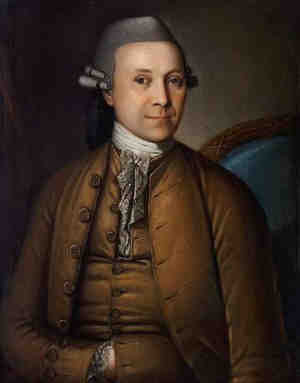
- Born: 4 May 1735; Vordingborg, Denmark
- Died: 5 June 1804 (aged 69); Copenhagen, Denmark

Academic background
- Education: University of Copenhagen

Academic work
- Discipline: Linguistics, Philology

Jacob Baden (4 May 1735 – 5 July 1804) was a Danish philologist, pedagogue, and critic. He was a professor of rhetoric and Latin at the University of Copenhagen in 1779. He was the first person to lecture on Danish grammar at the university between 1782 and 1783. He was the editor of the "University Journal" from 1793 to 1801.

He published a Danish-Latin dictionary, and also wrote an elementary Greek grammar book in 1764. He produced a Danish grammar book in the German language in 1767. His Danish grammar is still well recognized today.

== Early life and education ==
He was born at Vordingborg on 4 May 1735. His father, who was also called Jacob Baden, was rector of the local latin school. His mother Else Jacobine née From was a daughter of county manager (amtsforvalter) From at Antvorskov. He lost his father when he was 2 and was brought up by his mother. He enrolled at the University of Copenhagen at age 15. He was a resident of på Ehlers' Kollegium after passing his theological exams.

He later continued his studies at the University of Göttingen and University of Leipzig.

== Personal life ==
He married Charlotte Baden, a Danish writer in 1763. He died on 5 July 1804.

== Works ==
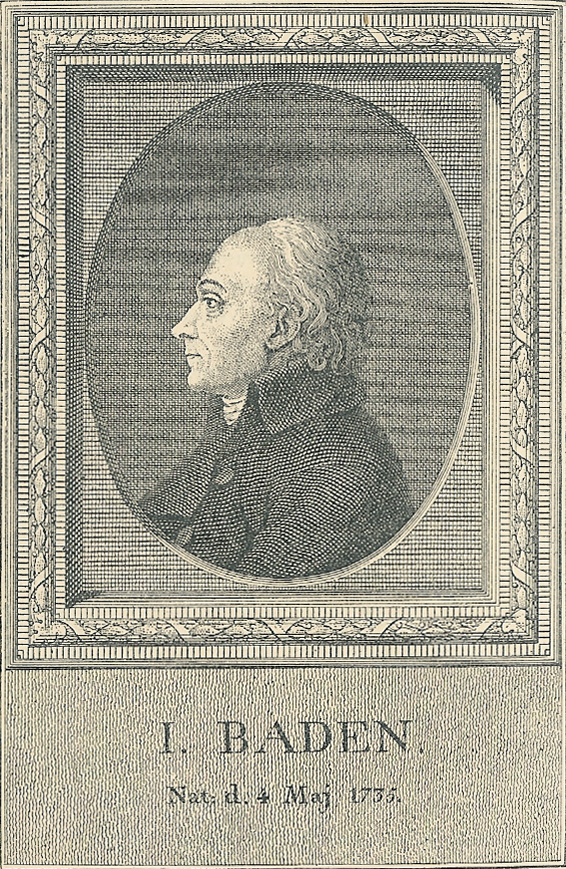
Jacob Baden, from P. Hansens Illustreret Dansk Litteraturhistorie

- Forelæsninger over det danske Sprog, eller resonneret dansk Grammatik (Lectures on Danish Language or Rational Danish Grammar) published in 1785. They contain treatments of Phonology and Morphology, syntax and Prosody.
- Danish grammar in German in 1767.
- Latin grammar.
- Danish grammar.
- Greek grammar.
- School editions of Virgil, Horace, and Phaedrus.
