= Ferdinand Meldahl =

Danish architect

Ferdinand Meldahl GCVO
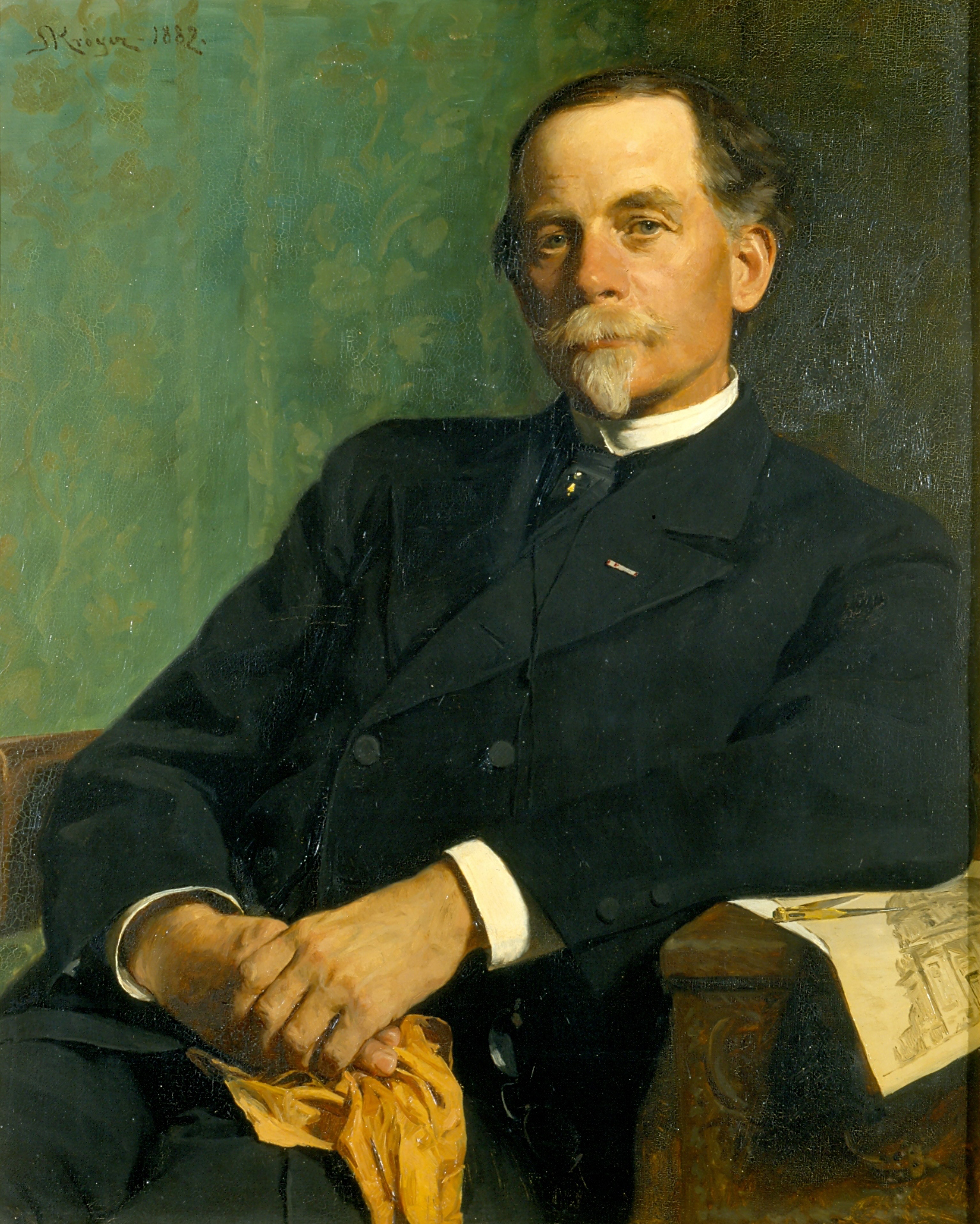
- Portrait of Ferdinand Meldahl painted by Peder Severin Krøyer in 1882
- Born: 16 March 1827; Frederiksberg
- Died: 3 February 1908 (aged 80); Copenhagen
- Occupation: Architect
- Buildings: Frederik's Church; Charlottenlund Palace

Signature
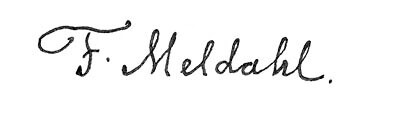

Ferdinand Meldahl (16 March 1827 – 3 February 1908) was a Danish architect best known for the reconstruction of Frederiksborg Castle after the fire in 1859. Meldahl was one of the leading proponents of historicism in Denmark.

== Biography ==
He was the son of architect Heinrich Meldahl. He worked in his father's iron foundry and was also trained as a bricklayer. He joined the Royal Danish Academy of Fine Arts, where he was educated as an architect. He conducted several study trips to Germany, France, Spain, the Netherlands, England, Egypt and Syria. As a member of the municipal council of Copenhagen Municipality for 27 years from 1866, Meldahl managed to significantly influence the city.

In 1857, he became a member of the Royal Danish Academy of Fine Arts and in 1863 a professor at the academy. He was its manager from 1873 to 1890. In 1904, he was appointed a Knight Grand Cross of the Royal Victorian Order on the occasion of the visit of King Edward VII of the United Kingdom. At the time he was Chamberlain to the King Christian IX of Denmark and Vice President of the Danish Royal Academy of Arts. He was appointed Knight of the Order of the Dannebrog (1861, Dannebrogsmand (1864), Commander of the 2nd degree of Dannebrog in (1874) and of the 1st degree that year and awarded the Cross of Honour of the Order of the Dannebrog (1904).

== Selected works ==
- City Hall of Fredericia (1859)
- Alþingishúsið in Reykjavík (1880–1881)
- Reconstruction of Frederiksborg Palace after the fire in 1859 (1860–1884)
- Completion of Frederik's Church in Copenhagen (1878–1894)

== See also ==
- List of honorary British knights and dames

== Other sources ==
- Ferdinand Meldahl (in Danish). Danmarks Radio.
- Hartung, Annette (2004-02-06) Huse fortæller historie (in Danish). Ingeniøren.
- Schiødte, Erik (1897) "Meldahl, Ferdinand" (in Danish) in Bricka, Carl Frederik (ed.) Dansk Biografisk Lexikon, tillige omfattende Norge for Tidsrummet 1537–1814, XI. bind, Maar–Müllner. Copenhagen: Gyldendalske Boghandels Forlag, pp. 250–53.

Cultural offices
Preceded by Wilhelm Marstrand	Director of the Royal Danish Academy of Fine Arts; 1873–1890	Succeeded by Otto Bache
