= Bitte Kai Rand =

Danish fashion designer

Bitte Kai Rand (born 1956) is a Danish fashion designer who established her own firm in 1981. Catering to mature women, her winter designs frequently consist of knitwear, while her elegant summer clothes are based mainly on cotton. She has successfully produced items that are considered timeless. With sales outlets in most of Europe, her shops can be found in Denmark, Sweden, and Norway.

== Biography ==
Born in 1956, Bitte Kai was the youngest of the five children of a Copenhagen dealer in sand and gravel. Brought up in the Copenhagen suburb of Charlottenlund, she showed an interest in sewing from an early age, cutting her mother's cloth to pieces while her siblings followed their academic development. After attending the Scandinavian Academy of Fashion Design (1973–1975) and the School of Design at the Royal Danish Academy of Fine Arts (1975–1979), she began to design clothing for teenagers.

Despite all expectations, Bitte Kai proved to be a successful designer, opening her own firm in 1981 when she was only 25. In 1983, she married the businessman Michael Rand, who fully supported her own business goals. They have two children, Carl and Oscar, both of whom are now involved in the family business.

Rand has become one of the leading Danish fashion designers. She brings out six new collections a year, focusing on quality and functionality. They are sold at some 450 outlets in most of Europe. In Denmark, Sweden, and Norway, the firm has its own shops, but there are also showrooms in London and Paris.
