= Jægersborg =

Urban area of Copenhagen, Denmark

Coordinates: 55.7619°N 12.5375°E

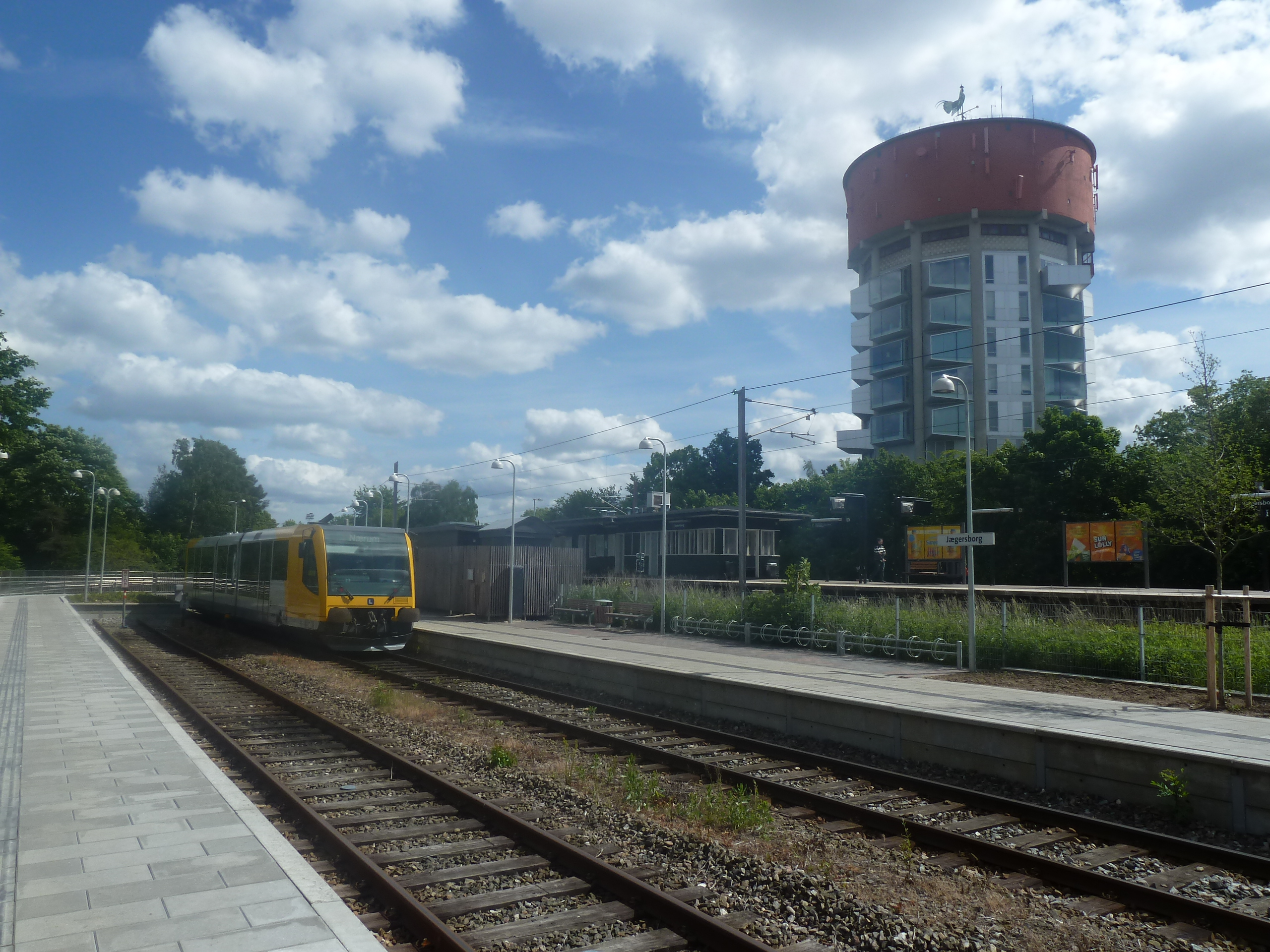
Jægersborg Water Tower, now youth housing, as seen from Jægersborg railway station.

Jægersborg is a suburban neighbourhood in Gentofte Municipality, some 12 km north of central Copenhagen, Denmark.

== History ==
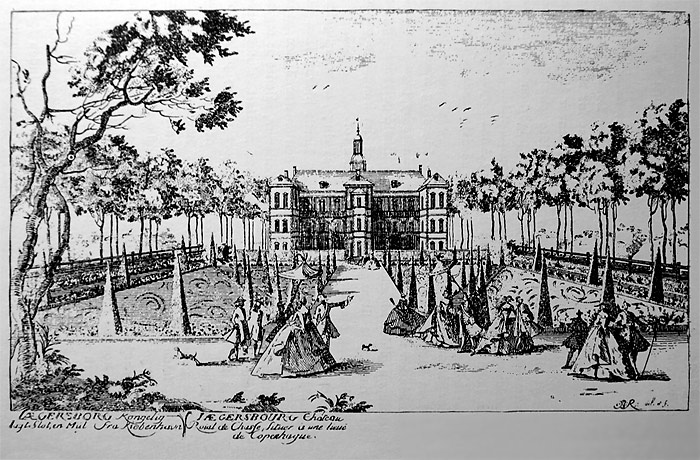
Jægersborg in 1747, engraving by B. de La Rocque

The whole area was from at least 1401 a royal estate known as Ibstrup (the earliest sources refer to it as Jepstorp). The nearest village was Mellerup located midway between Ibstrup and Ordrup. Its land came under Ibstrup when it disappeared in the middle of the 17th century.

The Ibstrup estate was since Queen Margaret's day used for royal hunts, although King Frederick II was the first to establish a royal residence at the site. In 1611, Christian IV replaced it with a new building, Ibstrup Slot, in Dutch Renaissance style surrounded by moats. King Frederick III gave the property to his consort, Queen Sophie Amalie.

Christian V, an enthusiast for hunting, renamed the house Jægersborg. A new tree-lined avenue, Jægersborg Allé, connected his property to Kongens Lyngby to the north and the Øresund coast to the east. He also made plans for the establishment of a deer park, Jægersborg Dyrehave, closing down the village Stokkerup.

Jægersborg fell into disrepair in the middle of the 18th century and new barracks for the Guard Hussars were established in its grounds. The old main building was demolished in 1761.

The land was sold off in lots and built over in the first half of the 20th century. Jægersborg Parish was disjoined from that of Gentofte in 1941,

== Landmarks ==
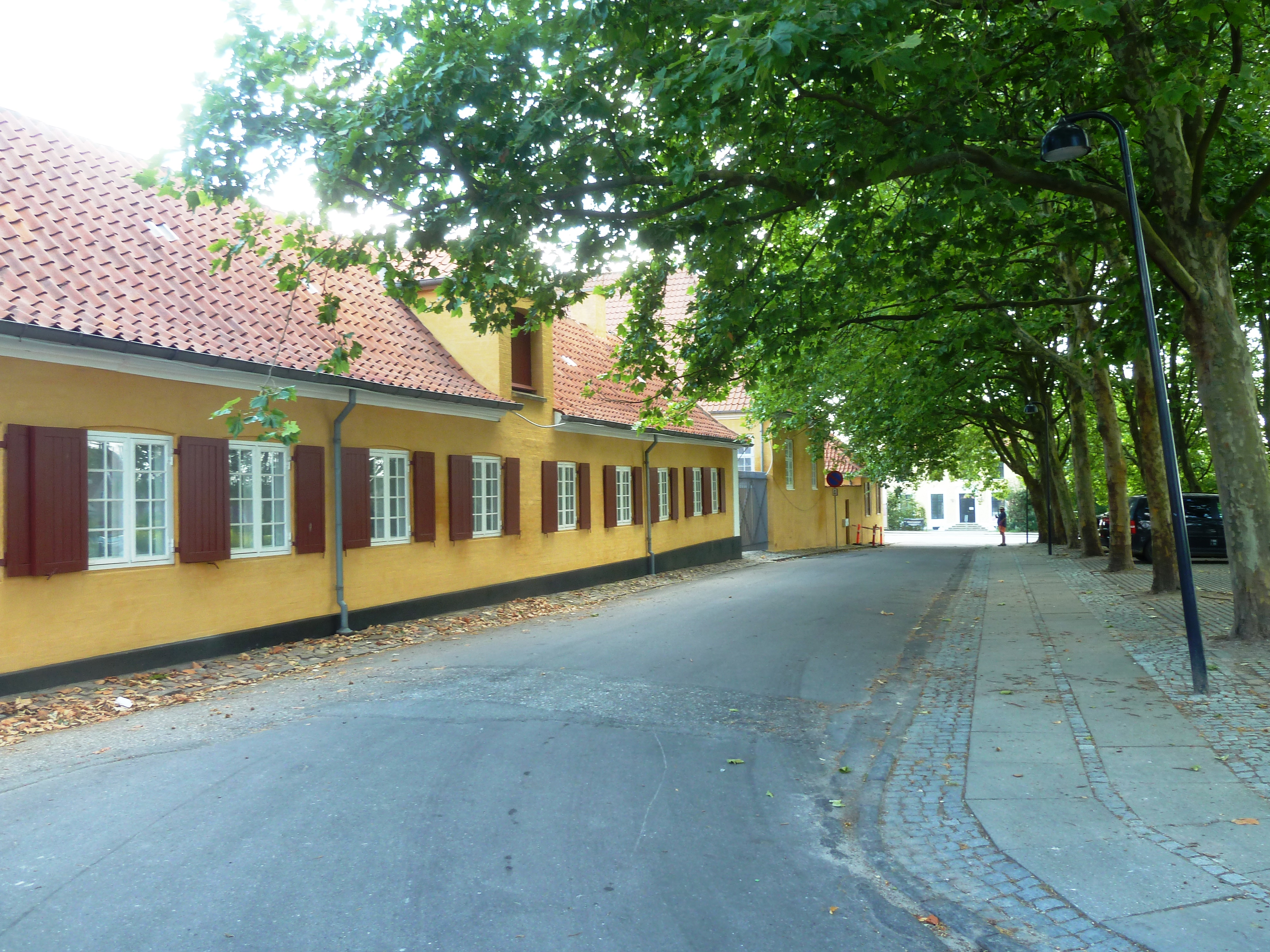
Jægersborg Barracks

The former Jægersborg Barracks were sold by the Royal Danish Army in 2010 and the buildings are now under conversion into a senior citizens home. The oldest complex is Jagtgården which was built to a design by Lauritz de Thurah at a site just west of Jægersborg in the 1730s. The four-winged building originally contained stables for hunting dogs.

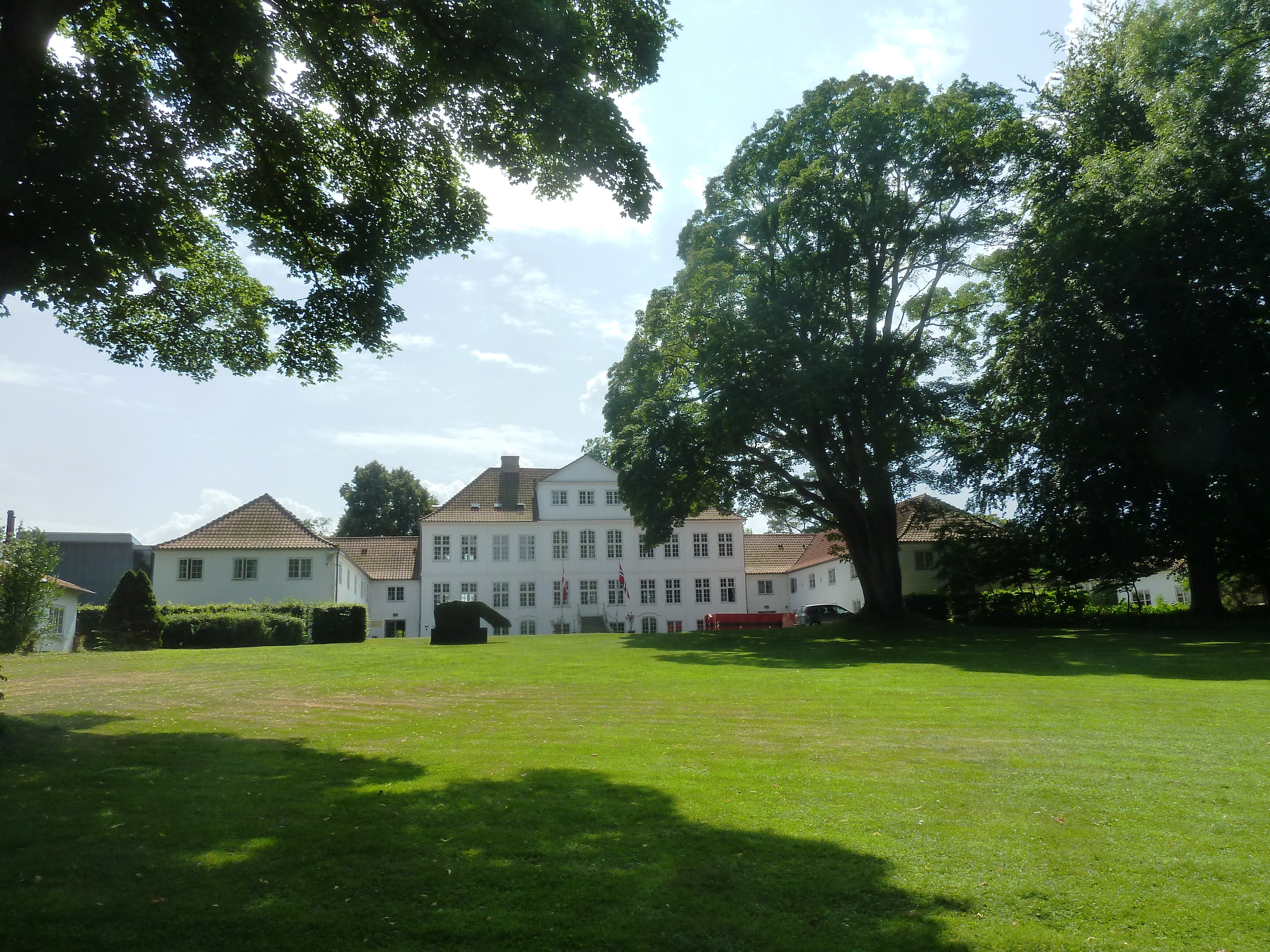
Schæffergården

Schæffergården (Jægersborg Allé 166) is a former country house built by Dietrich Schäffer in 1856. It is now owned by the Foundation for Norwegian-Danish Collaboration and used as a conference centre and events venue. and Overførstergården is located at Jægersborg Alle 139.

Jægersborg Church is from 1941 and was designed by Paul Staffeldt Matthiesen in a Neo-Gothic style. Located next to Jægersborg station, Jægersborg Water Tower was built in 1955 to designs by Edvard Thomsen. It was adapted for use as youth housing by Dorte Mandrup in 2005.

== Transport ==
Located on the Hillerød radial of the Copenhagen S-train network, Jægersborg station is served by the E-line. The A-line does not stop at this station. It is also the southern terminus of the Nærumbanen local railway.

== Notable people ==
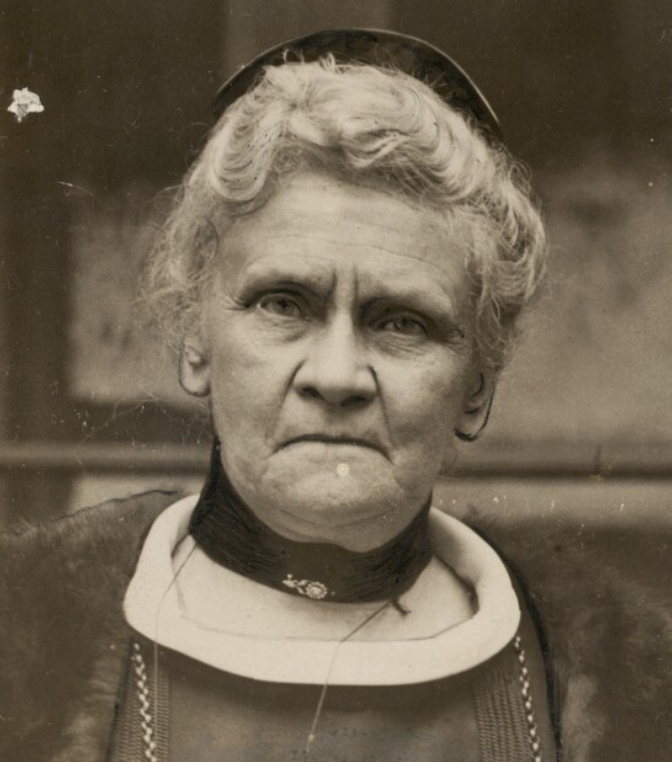
Louise Wright, 1918

- Louise Wright (1861–1935) a Danish philanthropist, feminist and peace activist; lived in Jægersborg from 1925
- Walter Christmas (1861 in Jægersborg – 1924) a Danish author, naval officer, diplomat, and spy
- Børge Monberg (1905 in Jægersborg – 1990) a Danish field hockey player, competed in the 1928 Summer Olympics
- Princess Feodora of Denmark (1910 in Jægersborghus – 1975) a Danish princess, daughter of Prince Harald of Denmark
- Princess Caroline-Mathilde of Denmark (1912 in Jægersborghus – 1995) a Danish princess, daughter of Prince Harald of Denmark, she became Hereditary Princess of Denmark
- Flemming Ahlberg (born 1946 in Jægersborg) a Danish former footballer who participated in the 1972 Summer Olympics

== Bibliography ==
- Mørkvig, Svend Aage: JÆGERSBORG – fra krongods til byområde
