= Princess Charlotte Amalie of Denmark =

Danish princess (1706–1782)

Charlotte Amalie of Denmark and Norway
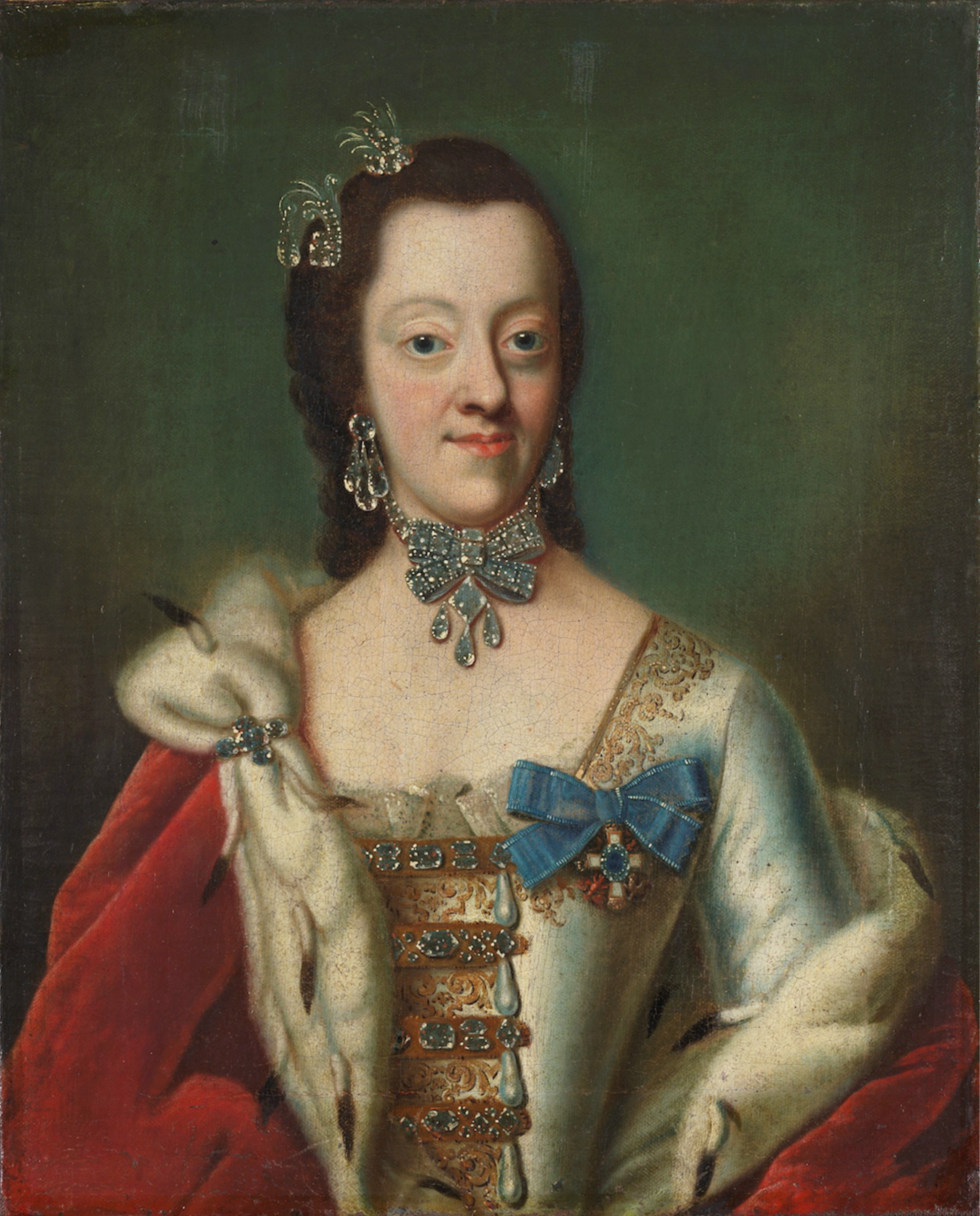
- Portrait of Princess Charlotte
- Born: 6 October 1706; Copenhagen Castle
- Died: 28 October 1782 (aged 76); Copenhagen
- Burial: Roskilde Cathedral
- House: Oldenburg
- Father: Frederick IV of Denmark
- Mother: Louise of Mecklenburg-Güstrow

Princess Charlotte Amalie of Denmark and Norway (6 October 1706 – 28 October 1782) was a Danish princess, daughter of King Frederick IV of Denmark and Louise of Mecklenburg-Güstrow.

== Life ==
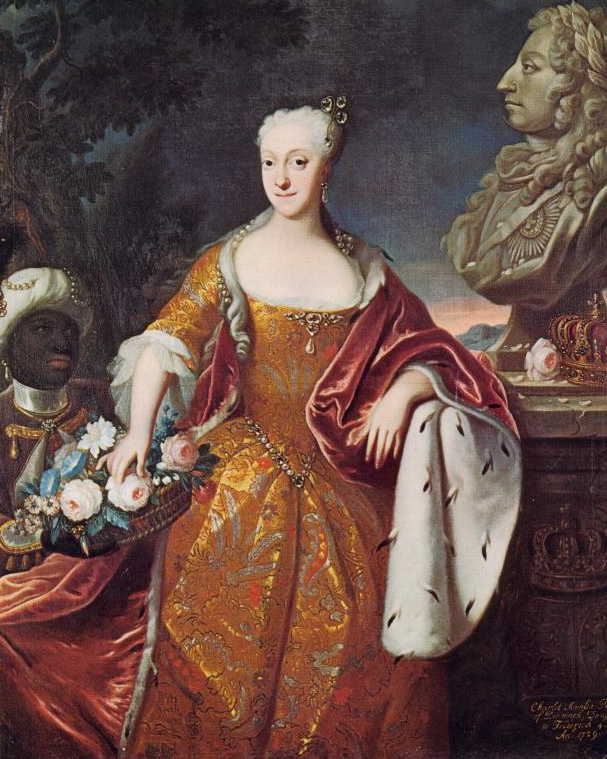
Portrait by Johann Salomon Wahl, 1729

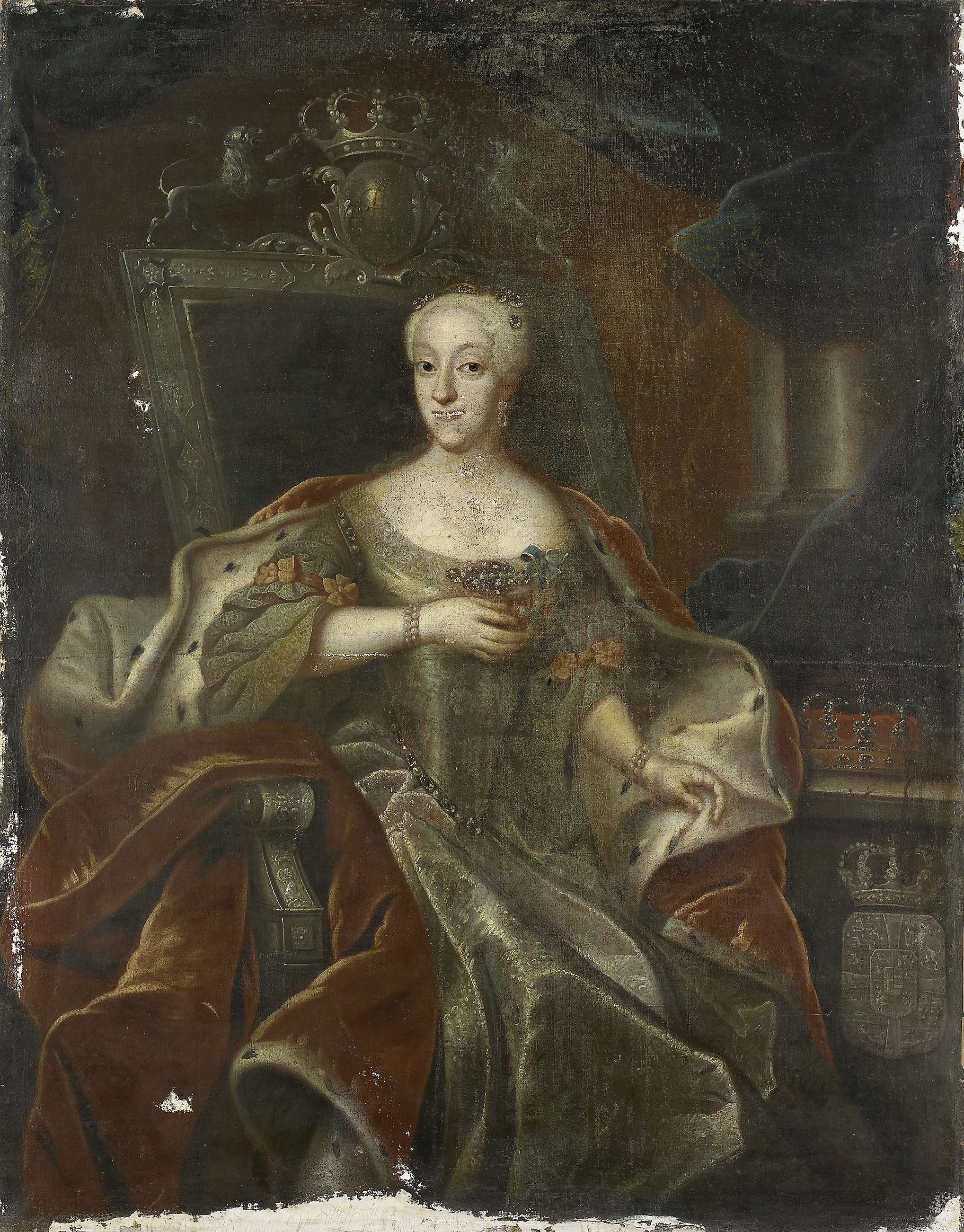
Portrait of Princess Charlotte Amalie, c. 1755-1765

Charlotte Amalie never married. In 1725, she was placed on the list of 99 princesses regarded as suitable for marriage with Louis XV of France (which would require that she convert to Catholicism), but she was removed from the list because Denmark-Norway was an arch enemy toward Sweden, the traditional ally of France, and that such a marriage could potentially disturb the French-Swedish alliance. In the early 1730s, her brother the king tried to arrange a marriage between her and Frederick, Prince of Wales, but the negotiations did not succeed and she remained unmarried.

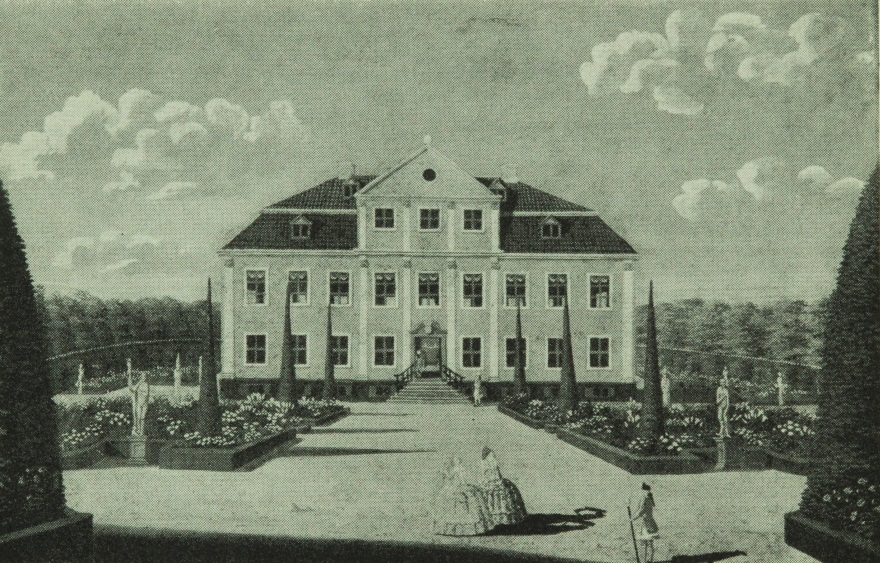
Charlottenlund in 1744

As was the custom for unmarried princesses, she lived with her mother until her mother's death, and then with her stepmother. In contrast to her brother and sister-in-law, she had a good relationship with her stepmother, Anna Sophie Reventlow. Charlotte Amalie tried to prevent the worst hostility toward her stepmother at court. She was separated from Anna Sophie when her brother succeeded to the throne in 1730. After this, she lived at the royal court in winters, and at Charlottenlund Palace in summer with her own court.

Charlotte Amalie was described by her contemporaries as a lovable character with the ability to keep the peace with most: she had a good relationship with her father and stepmother, and still managed to have a good relationship also with her brother, who hated his own father and stepmother. She had no influence upon the affairs of state, and lived a peaceful life at court her entire life.

On 8 April 1771, she was ordered to leave court. She spent the rest of her life with her nephew's widow, the queen dowager Juliana Maria. This meant that she continued to spend much of her time at court, when the queen dowager attended it: Juliana Maria became de facto regent in 1772. As she preferred black wigs, she had ordered her staff to wear them, and her court became known as "The court of the black wigs". After 1778, she no longer showed herself to the public, as she had become senile.

Charlotte Amalie is known as the benefactress of the writer Charlotte Baden, who was the niece of one of her chief ladies-in-waiting, Anna Susanne von der Osten. Baden was raised at her court, and Charlotte Amalie provided her with an education and an allowance. In her will from 1773, Charlotte Amalie created a foundation, Prinsesse C.A.s stiftelse, to finance the upbringing of poor girls of all classes.

== Legacy ==
Charlottenlund Palace, where she spent her summers, was built and named after her in 1731–1733. The main building owes its current appearance ton adaption undertaken by Frederick VIII of Denmark in the 1850s.

== Ancestry ==
Ancestors of Princess Charlotte Amalie of Denmark

16. Christian IV of Denmark
8. Frederick III of Denmark
17. Anne Catherine of Brandenburg
4. Christian V of Denmark
18. George, Duke of Brunswick-Lüneburg
9. Sophie Amalie of Brunswick-Lüneburg
19. Landgravine Anne Eleonore of Hesse-Darmstadt
2. Frederick IV of Denmark
20. William V, Landgrave of Hesse-Kassel
10. William VI, Landgrave of Hesse-Kassel
21. Countess Amalie Elisabeth of Hanau-Münzenberg
5. Charlotte Amalie of Hesse-Kassel
22. George William, Elector of Brandenburg
11. Margravine Hedwig Sophie of Brandenburg
23. Countess Palatine Elizabeth Charlotte of Simmern
1. Charlotte Amalie of Denmark and Norway
24. Johann VII, Duke of Mecklenburg-Schwerin
12. John Albert II, Duke of Mecklenburg
25. Sophia of Holstein-Gottorp
6. Gustav Adolf, Duke of Mecklenburg-Güstrow
26. Christian I, Prince of Anhalt-Bernburg
13. Eleonore Marie of Anhalt-Bernburg
27. Anna of Bentheim-Tecklenburg
3. Louise of Mecklenburg-Güstrow
28. John Adolf, Duke of Schleswig-Holstein-Gottorp
14. Frederick III, Duke of Schleswig-Holstein-Gottorp
29. Princess Augusta of Denmark
7. Magdalena Sibylla of Holstein-Gottorp
30. John George I, Elector of Saxony
15. Duchess Marie Elisabeth of Saxony
31. Duchess Magdalene Sibylle of Prussia
