= DB Class 628 =

German class of diesel multiple units

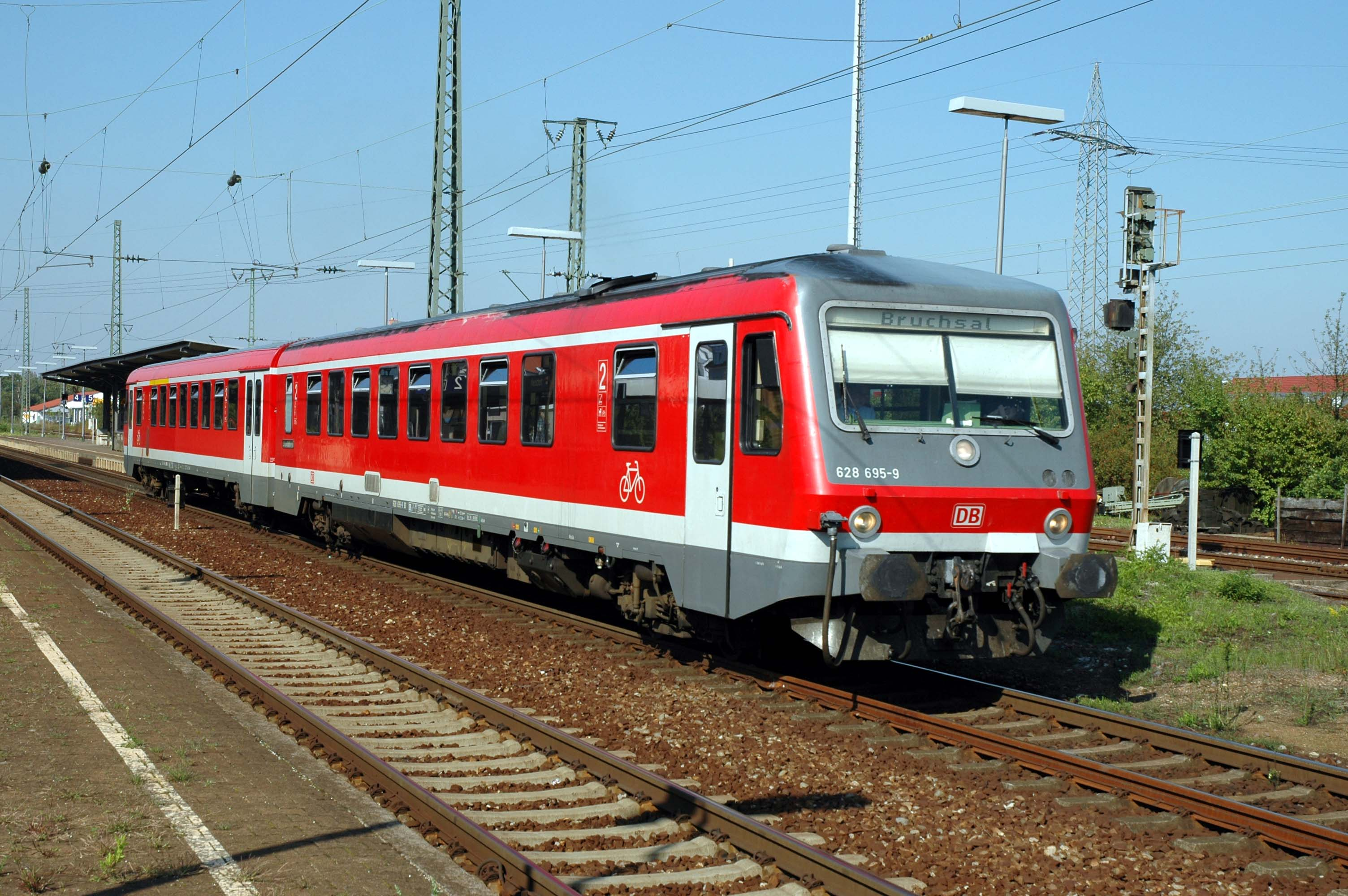
- Class 628.4 diesel railcar
- Stock type: 2-car diesel multiple unit
- Manufacturers: Duewag, Waggon Union, AEG, Linke-Hofmann-Busch, MBB
- Constructed: 628.0: 1974–1975; 628.1: 1981; 628.2: 1986–1989; 628.4: 1992–1996; 628.9/629.0: 1994–1995
- Number built: 628.0: 12; 628.1: 3; 628.2: 150; 628.4: 309; 628.9/629: 5
- Fleet numbers: 628 001–024 (+928.0 / 628.0); 628 101–103 (+928.1); 628 201–350 (+928.2 / 629.2); 628 401–704 (+928.4); 628 901–905 (+629.0)

Specifications
- Train length: 44.35–46.4 m (145 ft 6 in – 152 ft 2 3/4 in)
- Maximum speed: 120 km/h (75 mph)
- Weight: 63.6–84.0 t (62.6–82.7 long tons; 70.1–92.6 short tons)
- Prime mover: MTU 183 TD 12
- Engine type: V12 diesel with turbocharger and charge cooling
- Power output: 485 kW (650 hp) at 2100 rpm
- Transmission: Voith T 311r WK fluid converter coupling
- UIC classification: B’2’+2’B’ (628.0); 2’B’+B’2’ (628.9/629(.0)); 2’B’+B’2’ (628.3/629.3); 2’B’+2’2’ (Rest)
- Minimum turning radius: 125 m (410 ft)
- Braking system: KE-R-A
- Safety system: Sifa / PZB
- Multiple working: MICAS (microprocessor-supported multiple-unit control)
- Track gauge: 1,435 mm (4 ft 8 1/2 in) standard gauge

The DB Class 628 is a twin-car, diesel multiple unit operated by the Deutsche Bahn for local passenger rail services.

== Design ==
(The following description is primarily related to the Class 628.4, and is largely valid for the other variants as well)

Each coach rests on two twin-axle bogies. Only the bogie at the close-coupled end of the coach is driven. Power transmission from the motor is achieved using a Voith hydrodynamic transmission system with a converter (Wandler) and a T 311r coupling. Up to Class 628, a T 320 double-converter transmission was used. Motor and transmission are suspended elastically under the lightweight coach body. The operating brake is an automatic compressed air KE disc brake with automatic load braking and electronic anti-skid protection. In addition, for rapid braking, electromagnetic rail brakes are used; these can also be activated separately if required.

Coupled running enables up to four coupled pairs of coaches to be driven from one driver's cab. The control panel resembles that of the DB's standard driving consoles. Safety equipment includes the dead man's switch system, Sifa, which is mandatory in Germany, as well as PZB 90 based on the I60R (Class 628.4) or I60 with ER24 recording device (Class 628.2) and train radio.

Class 628 units have proved to be reliable and economical in practice. Now that newer vehicles have appeared, though, passengers on the 628s will miss a number of refinements, especially air-conditioning, but also easier, more accessible, disabled-friendly doors, because immediately behind the doors (one double or single door in the center and one single door next to each driver's position) there are two steps in order to reach low platforms. On some 628s, new passenger information systems with automatic announcements and displays for the next stop have been installed and in many regions ticket machines have also been fitted, as had been planned in the design.

Over the years the vehicles have not been completely free of technical problems, but the list of deficiencies is very short. For example, the coolant has a tendency to overheat on hot days if the radiators are not thoroughly cleaned. When traction conditions are poor, the 628 may not reach the speeds required by the timetable due to its low adhesive weight. Because the vehicles by today's standards are quite underpowered, its use on hilly routes results in long journey times. On newer vehicles, such as the Desiro (642), the Talent (643 and 644) or the LINT (648), which have partly replaced the 628s, two power cars have been used and the higher resultant costs accepted. Single-unit class 650 (Regio-Shuttle) has received two engines, so all axles are powered.

== History ==
=== Class 628.0 ===
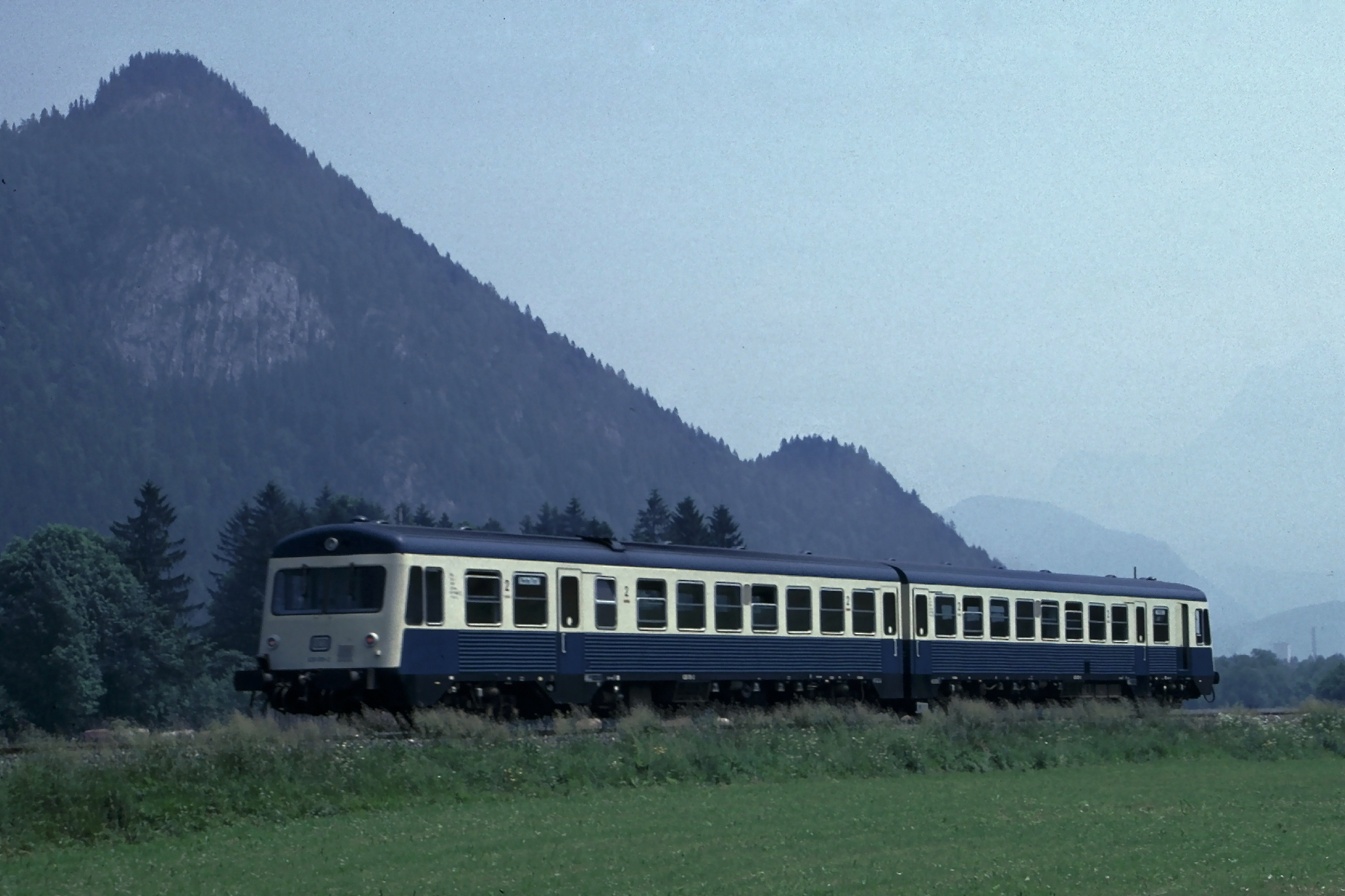
628.0 on the Ausserfernbahn line near Schönbichl (A)

The development of the Class 628 began as far back as the early 1970s, when the Class 795 and 798 railbuses were reaching the end of their estimated useful life. The Bundesbahn's central office (Bundesbahn-Zentralamt) in Munich, in cooperation with the Waggonfabrik Uerdingen, began with the concept of a Class 628 local, passenger, multiple-unit, that were to replace the railbuses, the accumulator railcars of Class 515. The new vehicles were also to be capable of being used on main lines, which required an increase in their top speed, stronger brake systems and greater comfort compared with the railbuses, but which were not to be more expensive to run than a railbus. In 1974, only 2 years later, Waggonfabrik Uerdingen and MaK demonstrated the prototypes of the two-unit Class 628.0 and also a single-coach variant, the Class 627, for use on routes with lower numbers of passengers. The vehicles were tested and proved themselves exceptionally well, even though the lack of the power from the engines was already apparent on occasions. Initially it did not go into production, because for political reasons local passenger rail services were just being reorganised and it was not yet clear, which and how many vehicles would be needed. So the Class 628 project stalled for almost four years.

==== Design and technical data ====
===== Motor =====
The following diesel motors are used on the Class 628.0 diesel multiple units:

MAN D 3256 BTXU

- Installed in Class 628.0 (628 001/011 to 628 005/015)
- Type: Four-stroke diesel engine with turbocharging and water cooling
- Layout: 6-cylinder in-line motor (horizontal)
- Usable power: 210 kW (290 PS; 280 hp)
- Rpm: 2,100 rpm
- Stroke x Bore: 150 mm × 132 mm (5.91 in × 5.20 in)
- Total weight: 1,160 kg (2,560 lb)

KHD V 12 L 413F

- Installed in Class 628.0 (628 006/016 to 628 010/020, on 628 006 to 008 other motors now fitted)
- Type: diesel motor with air cooling
- Layout: V 12, 90°
- Usable power: 206 kW (280 PS; 276 hp)
- Rpm: 2,100 rpm
- Stroke x Bore: 130 mm × 125 mm (5.12 in × 4.92 in)
- Total weight: 1,220 kg (2,690 lb)

For the Charlevoix tourist train

- Daimler-Benz
- Usable power: 485 hp (362 kW)

===== Transmission =====
Voith T 320r transmission systems are installed in these railcars. Experimentally some vehicles were fitted with an H-brake.

Technical data for the transmission:

- Two hydraulic fluid drives
- Reversing with electro-pneumatic actuation
- Primary influence by primary control and lubricating pump pressure
- Transferable power: Class 628.0 = 202 kW (275 PS; 271 hp) at 2,100 rpm

The reversing gear is combined with the fluid drive and serves to change the direction or running. Reversing can be achieved during idling and also when the motor is switched off, but only when the vehicle is static and the drive has been emptied. It is activated with compressed air.

=== Class 628.1/928.1 ===
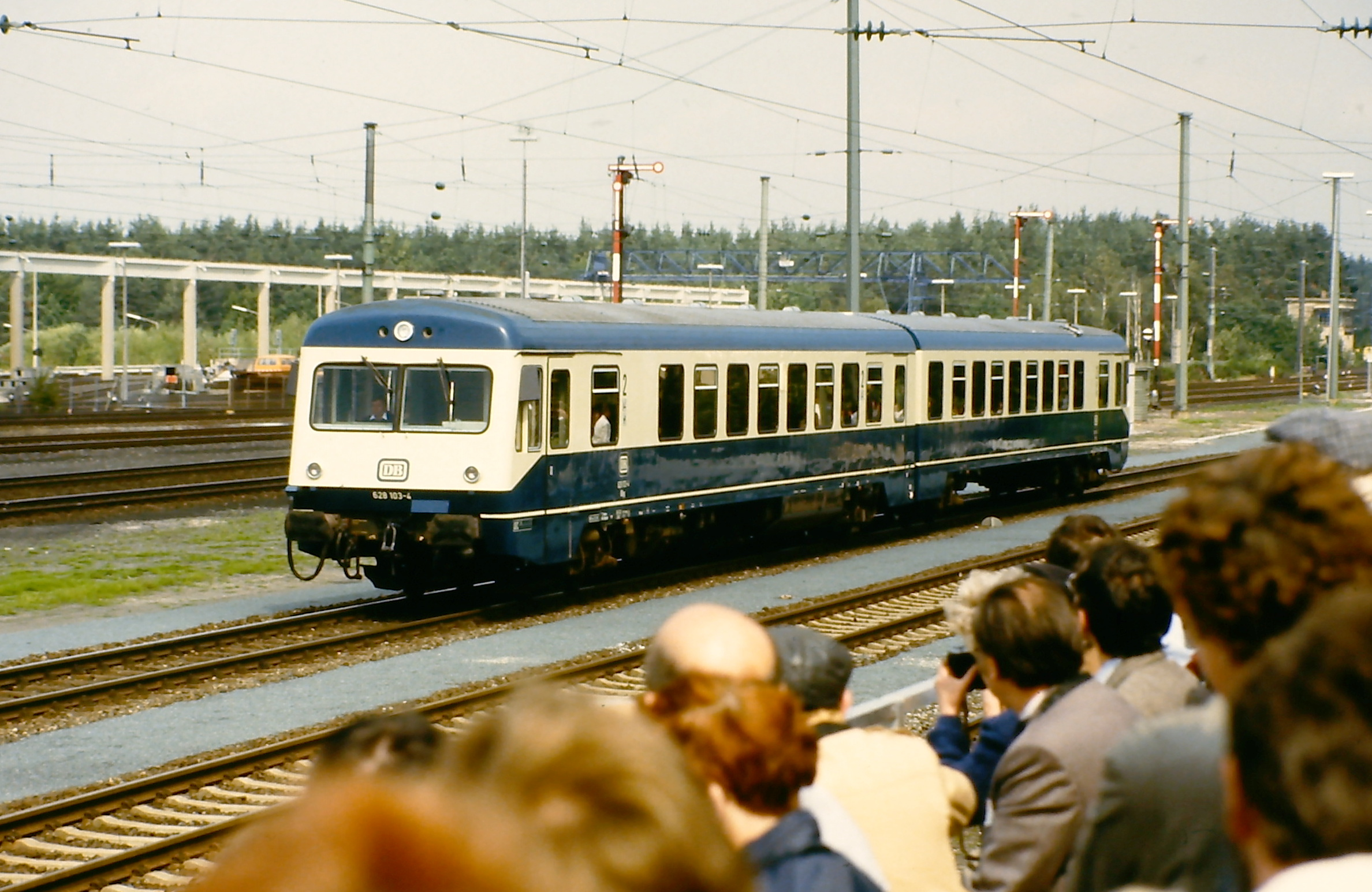
628 103

Behind the scenes, engineers continued to develop the railcar apace. In 1981 they demonstrated the Class 628.1. The most important difference was that the second power car was dropped, because the remaining one was strong enough to move the coupled pair. The second unit could therefore be used as a driving car (designated the Class 928.1). Together with a few other changes, such as a simplified electrical system, the omission of one of the two toilets and one of the four entrances each side, and the installation of equipment to enable one-man operation, the new variant was even more economical. In addition there was a single-coach version again, the Class 627.1, of which 5 prototypes were procured. The new vehicles were tested for two years and, like their predecessors, proved to be outstanding, so that nothing stood in the way as the two-car version went into production. The single-unit variant did not, however, as it had only a few more seats than a bus and could not be deployed economically. Coach number 628 102 is unusual in being the only one of this small batch with a 1st class compartment.

=== Class 628.2/928.2 ===
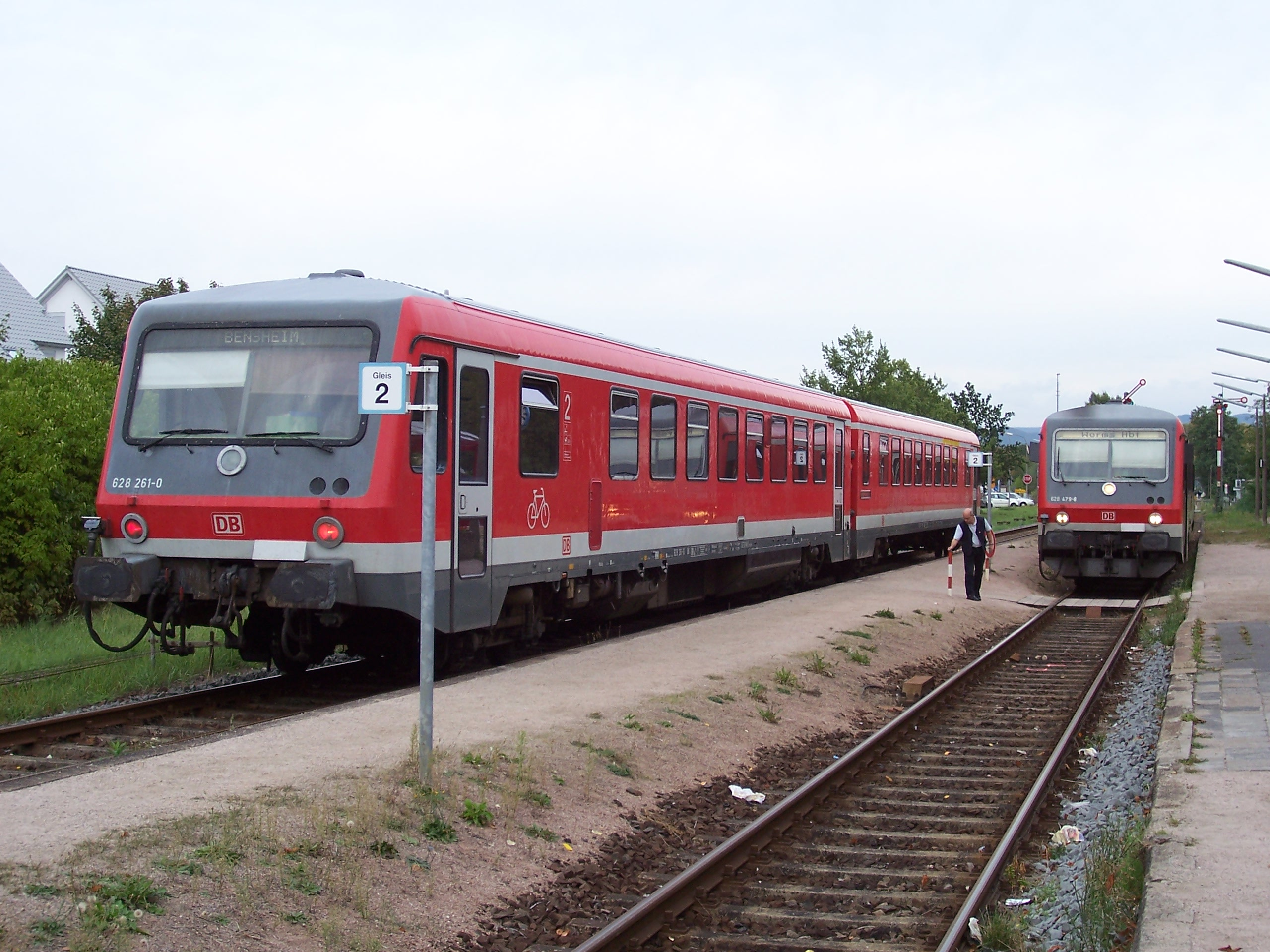
628.2 in traffic red at Lorsch

Before it became widespread, however, a number of short-term requirements from the future production Class 628.2 units were integrated, including a 1st class open compartment, better ventilation and a dividing wall between the driver's cab and the passenger compartment. Externally the front and back were more angled, the triple headlamp was moved down and a train destination display added in order to improve the vehicle's appearance and to keep passengers better informed. In all, 150 of these units were procured between 1986 and 1989. At the Kiel locomotive depot (Betriebswerk) several of these railcars were driven for a while at up to 140 km/h (87 mph), but because this seriously increased wear and tear, these express duties were soon terminated again. The Class 628.2 with the DB's Regionalbahn in Schleswig-Holstein was given a redesign with new seats, new interior decor, wheelchair ramps etc. Several years before, a Karlsruhe 628.2 had also been given a fundamental modernisation of its interior. A few units were sold to private operators in the Czech Republic.

=== Class 628.4/928.4 ===
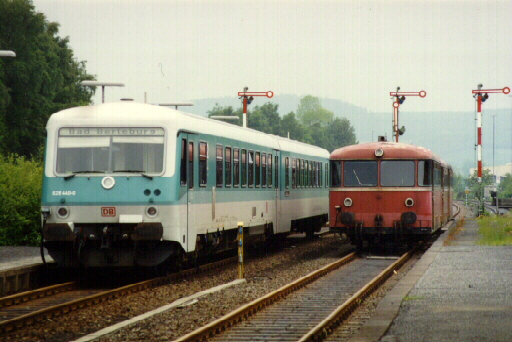
628.4 in peppermint green and white alongside its predecessor, the Uerdingen railbus in 1997 at Erndtebrück

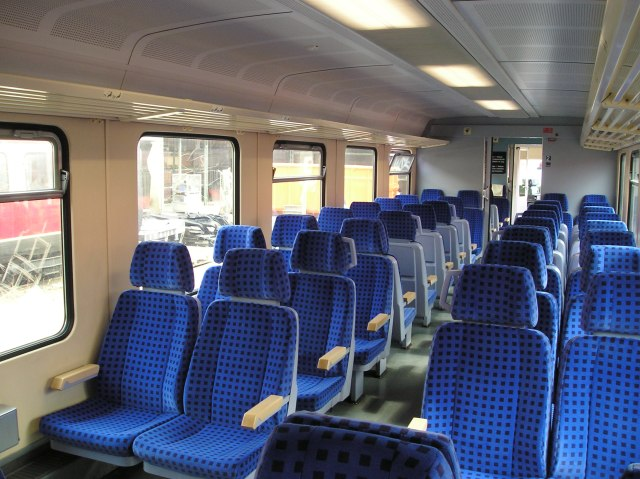
Reupholstered interior of a 628.4 in current DB design

The second series was able to benefit from the everyday experience that had been gained in using the railcars. In 1992 Duewag (formerly Waggonbau Uerdingen) proposed the Class 628.4 railcar, which once again had technical improvements and other refinements. The power of the diesel engine was increased by about 20% by using "charge cooling". The lower window panes on the doors were omitted as they had occasionally been broken on its predecessors, the Class 628.2, by flying stones. In order to install a double door at the close-coupled end of the two coaches in the multiple, they were both extended in length by about 50 cm each. Between November 1992 and Januar 1996 a total of 309 railcars were built, of which several were delivered to other railway companies, including those in Luxembourg (see Operations) and Romania.

The first vehicles in the regions of Rhein-Ruhr and the Southwest were given a modernisation of the interior. The railcars were matched to the current DB interior design. The seats have blue cushions and arm rests made of beech wood, the walls are silvery, the luggage section completely white, the windows are equipped with emergency hammers. The colour of the entrance area is white, and in some cases larger bicycle sections were installed in the centre of the carriage. On some of the units, the doors were also fitted with sensors.

=== Class 628.9/629 ===
A special variant based on Class 628.4 was procured for duties on the hilly Alzey–Mainz railway. Five multiples were bought, both coaches in each pair being motorised. These trains were designated as Class 628.9/629, but apart from having two power cars were identical with the Class 628.4. Due to their higher maintenance and operating costs there is no likelihood of the 628.9/629s being procured for use on lines which are predominantly level. The 628.9/629s do not need double the fuel of a 628, because the two power cars have shorter periods under load.

A sixth set has been procured by motorising a driving coach. Another set was formed in 2004 from two 628.4 sets whose driving trailers were damaged in accidents. This set has no first class accommodation, as the internal layout has not been changed.

Two more 629s appeared in 2004 based on former 628.2s, that work with another 628.2 instead of a driving car.

Two sets have been stationed at Ulm Hauptbahnhof with running numbers 628/629 340 (629 340 ex 628 341) and 628/629 344 (629 344 ex 628 349). Since 8 August 2008 Regio Südwest also has a set numbered 628 301/629 301 (629 301 ex 628 257), which should follow the other two.

=== Private railways ===
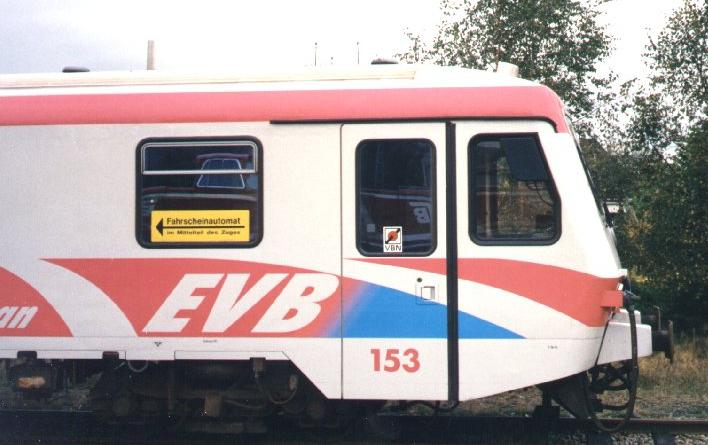
VT 153 of the EVB

Because in the early 1990s hardly any other railcars were available, several private railways also bought railcars of this type. In 1993/94 Eisenbahnen und Verkehrsbetriebe Elbe-Weser (EVB) took delivery of five 628.4/928.4 sets, in 1994 Frankfurt-Königsteiner Eisenbahn (FKE) bought one 628.4/928.4 and, in 1995, two 628.9/629s. In 1995 Westerwaldbahn GmbH took over the Daadetalbahn line with one DB 628.4/928.4 (628 677); it added a 628.4 from FKE in 2008.

== Operations ==
=== Class 628.0 ===
All the Class 628.0 prototype vehicles were finally homed at the depot (Bahnbetriebswerk) in Kempten im Allgäu. From there they were deployed to all the lines in the Allgäu region until the end of 2002. From 2003 they reduced their radius of action to the Ausserfernbahn, and in January 2005 the last vehicle of this class (628 008/018) was finally withdrawn. Several have already been scrapped, others sold to Poland, where they have been repainted and were placed in service again in the winter of 2005/2006 for the Masovian Railways.

=== Class 628.1 ===
The three multiples of the transitional class, 628.1 (628 / 928 101, 102 and 103), were all stabled at Kempten im Allgäu from the outset. From here they were used until 8 December 2007 in regular services on the Ausserfernbahn and on the Illertalbahn. Until the timetable change in 2006 they also ran to other destinations in the Allgäu, e.g. on the line from Augsburg to Füssen. At their last general inspection in 2001/2002 the vehicles underwent a number of modifications in order to standardise them with the sub-class 628.2. In early 2008 all 628.1s were withdrawn and, in that year, they were transferred to Hamm. In 2012 two units - 628 102 and 103 - were sold to the Sodema Inc. Société de gestion des équipements publics de Charlevoix in Canada where they operate in the Charlevoix region as the Charlevoix tourist train.

=== Class 628.2/.4 ===
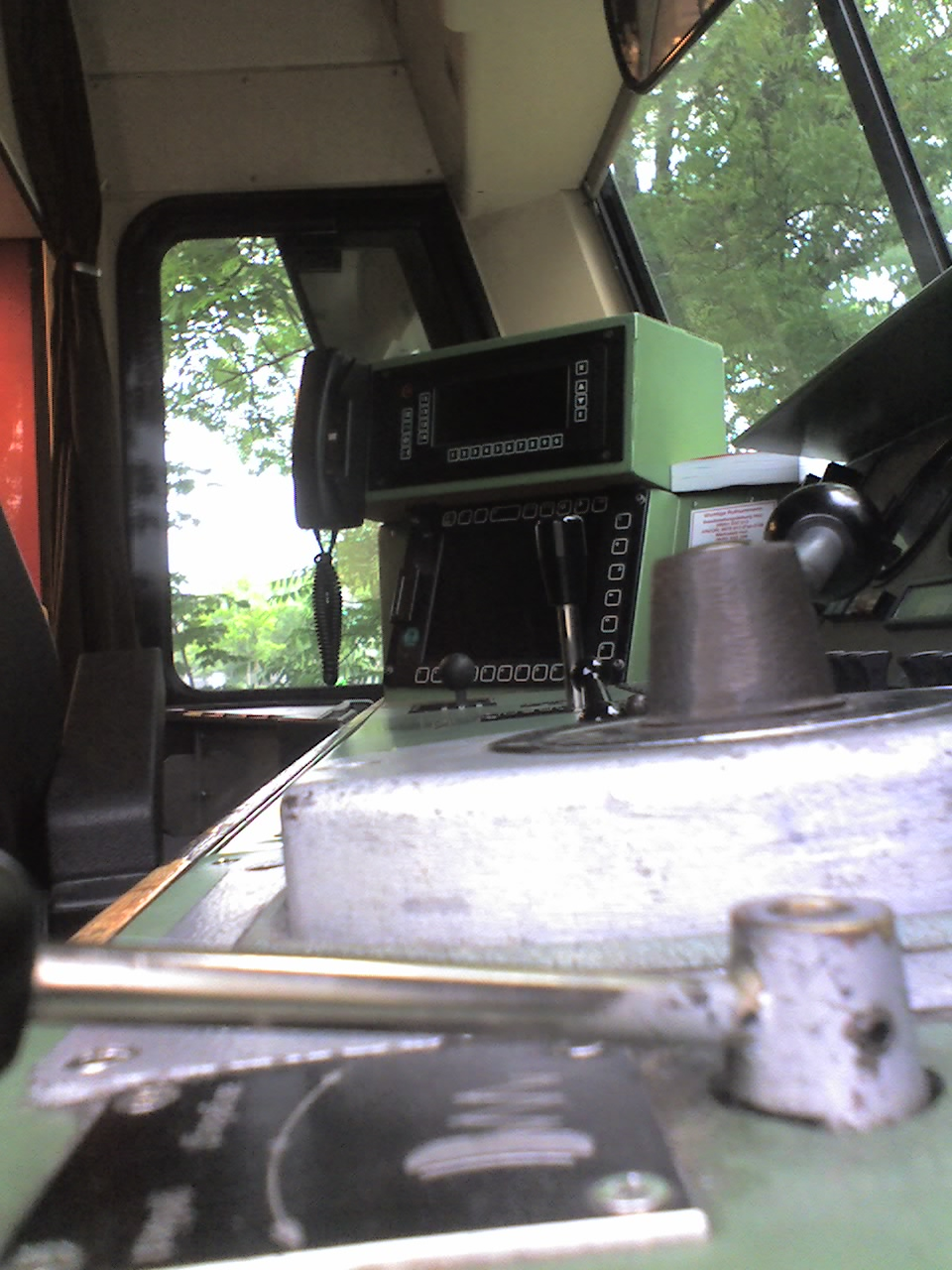
Driver's cab on a Class 628.4

Multiple units of sub-classes 628.2 and .4 are used across virtually the whole of Germany, on main lines as well as branch lines.

Currently multiples comprising two, coupled, Class 628 power cars work the Worms–Bingen Stadt railway as well as lines in the area around Ulm and which are thus different from the 628.9/629 compositions on the Alzey–Mainz railway. In particular they can be told by the lack of a 1st class compartment and the two toilets in the centre of the train. There are also no folding seats as found in the driving cars or in the 629.

The Luxembourg State Railways, CFL, owns two 628.4/928.4, which are numbered as per the DB system (628 505-0/928 505-7 und 628 506-8/928 506-5). These are identical with their counterparts in the DB apart from the company logo at the front: initially painted in peppermint green and white, but since 2001 in red livery. They ply between Trier and Luxembourg (as do German 628s; on this route mostly in double traction together) as well as providing passenger services within Luxembourg itself.

== Services ==
Class 628.2 and 628.4 are used on the following services in the different regions (2012):

=== Bavaria ===
- RB Bogen – Neufahrn (Niederbayern)
- RB Mühldorf – Burghausen
- RB Mühldorf – Landshut
- RB Mühldorf – Rosenheim
- RB Mühldorf – Freilassing (- Salzburg)
- RB Mühldorf – Simbach am Inn
- RB Mühldorf – Passau
- RB Traunstein – Waging
- RB Wasserburg – Ebersberg
- RB Mühldorf – Traunstein

=== Rhineland-Palatinate ===
- RB51 Karlsruhe Hbf - Neustadt(Weinstr.)
- RB52 Wörth (Rhein) - Lauterbourg(F)
- RB53 Neustadt(Weinstr.) - Wissembourg(F)
- RE6 Karlsruhe Hbf - Neustadt (Weinstr.)
- RB64 Kaiserslautern - Pirmasens
- RB66 Kaiserslautern - Lauterecken-Grumbach
- RB67 Kaiserslautern - Landstuhl - Kusel

This services are replacement for br642 and br643, so there are only a few trains with 628. There is almost daily use on the lines: RB52, RB53, RE6, RB66 and RB67

=== Schleswig-Holstein ===
- NEG Niebüll – Dagebüll Mole
- NEG RB Niebüll - Toender ST

With Deutsche Bahn, only 628 685 remains and is used on Flensburg–Eckernförde and Kiel–Neumünster services.

=== Czech railways service ===
operator Arriva vlaky (CZ-ARR 845.101 ex 628.286, 845.102 ex 628.221, 845.103 ex 628.212, 845.104 ex 628.329)

- International express train Praha – Přerov – Uherské Hradiště – Trenčín – Nitra
- Express train Praha – České Budějovice – Český Krumlov – Nová Pec (until 9 December 2017)
- Suburban rail Praha – Benešov u Prahy (until 7 December 2018)
- Suburban rail Praha – Roztoky u Prahy (from 9 December 2018)

From 8 December 2019 this class should provide express trains on four lines instead of České dráhy

- Express train R21 Praha – Mladá Boleslav – Turnov – Tanvald
- Express train R22 Kolín – Mladá Boleslav – Česká Lípa – Nový Bor
- Express train R24 Praha – Kladno – Rakovník
- Express train R26 Praha – Beroun – Příbram – Písek – České Budějovice

operator GW Train Regio (D-GWTR 628.214, 628.239, 628.241, 628.343, Not yet operational – 628.283, 628.319)

- Express train R25 Plzeň hl.n. – Most
- summer backup to class 654 of passenger trains on route České Budějovice – Český Krumlov – Nové Údolí

=== Slovak railways service ===
operator RegioJet (D-RJ 628.302, 628.304, 628.307, 628.315)

- Suburban rail Bratislava – Dunajská Streda – Komárno

== Gallery ==
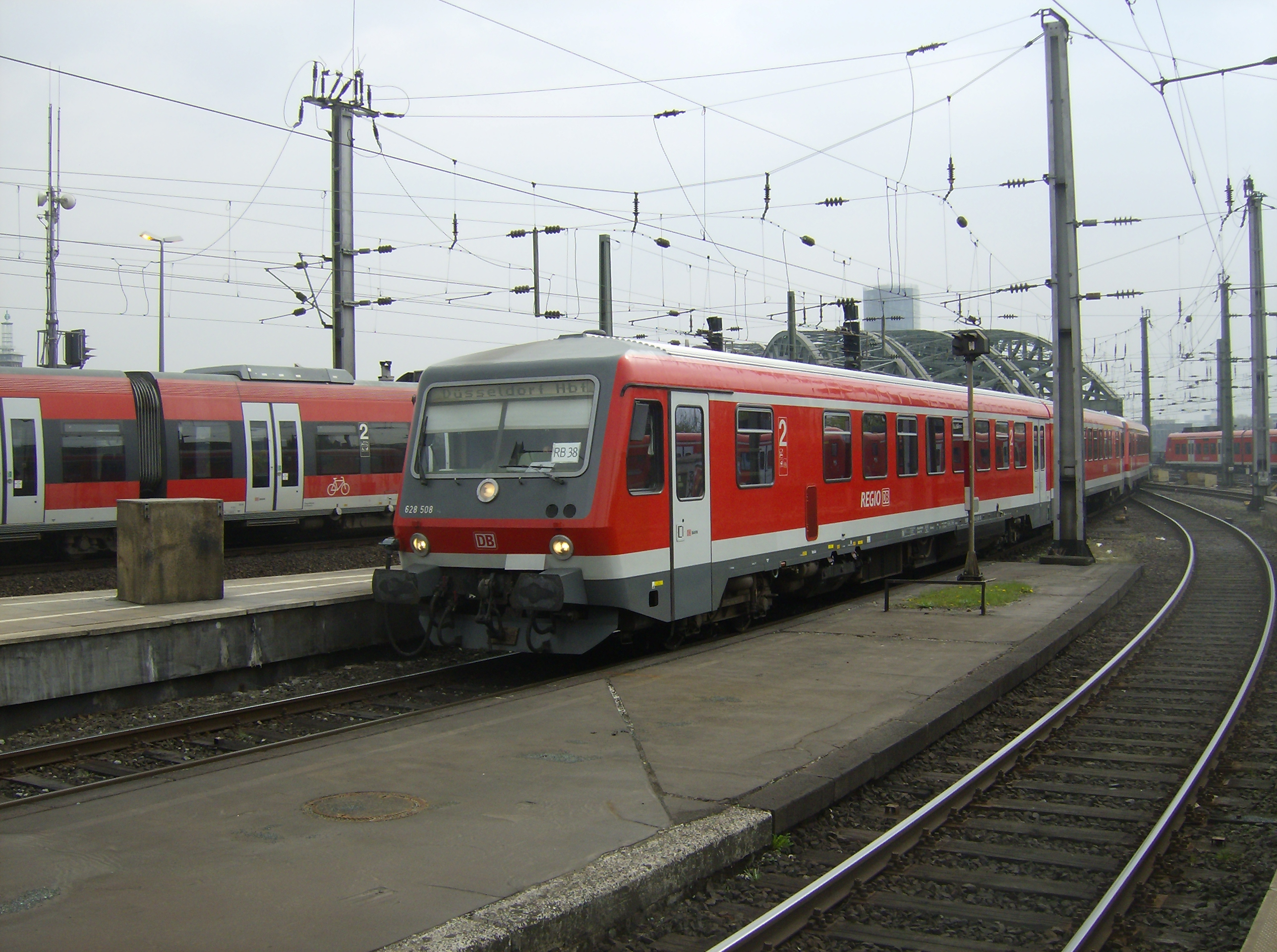
628 508 arrives at Köln Hbf

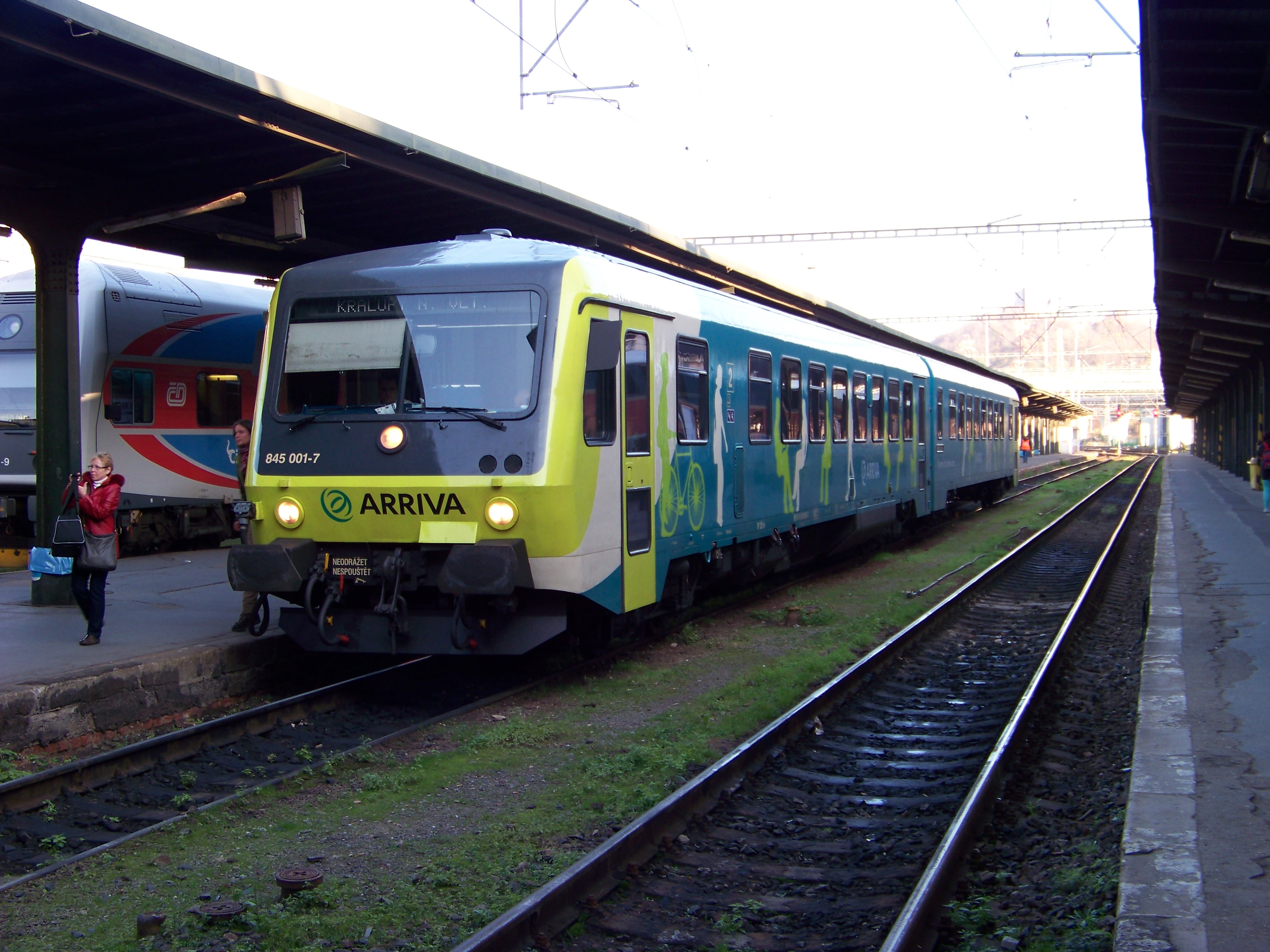
ex 628 286 at Praha Masarykovo nádraží

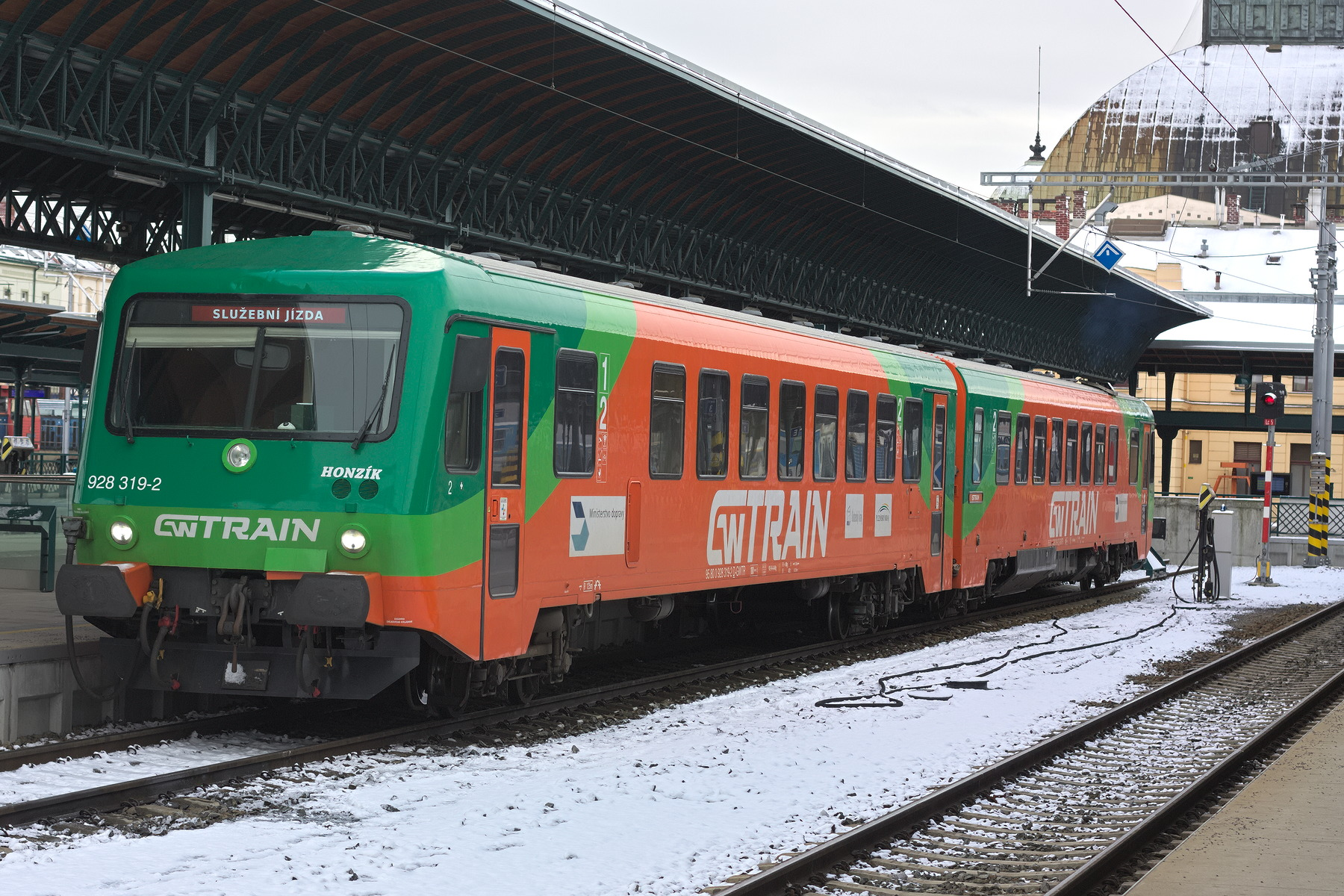
ex 628 319 at Plzeň main railway station

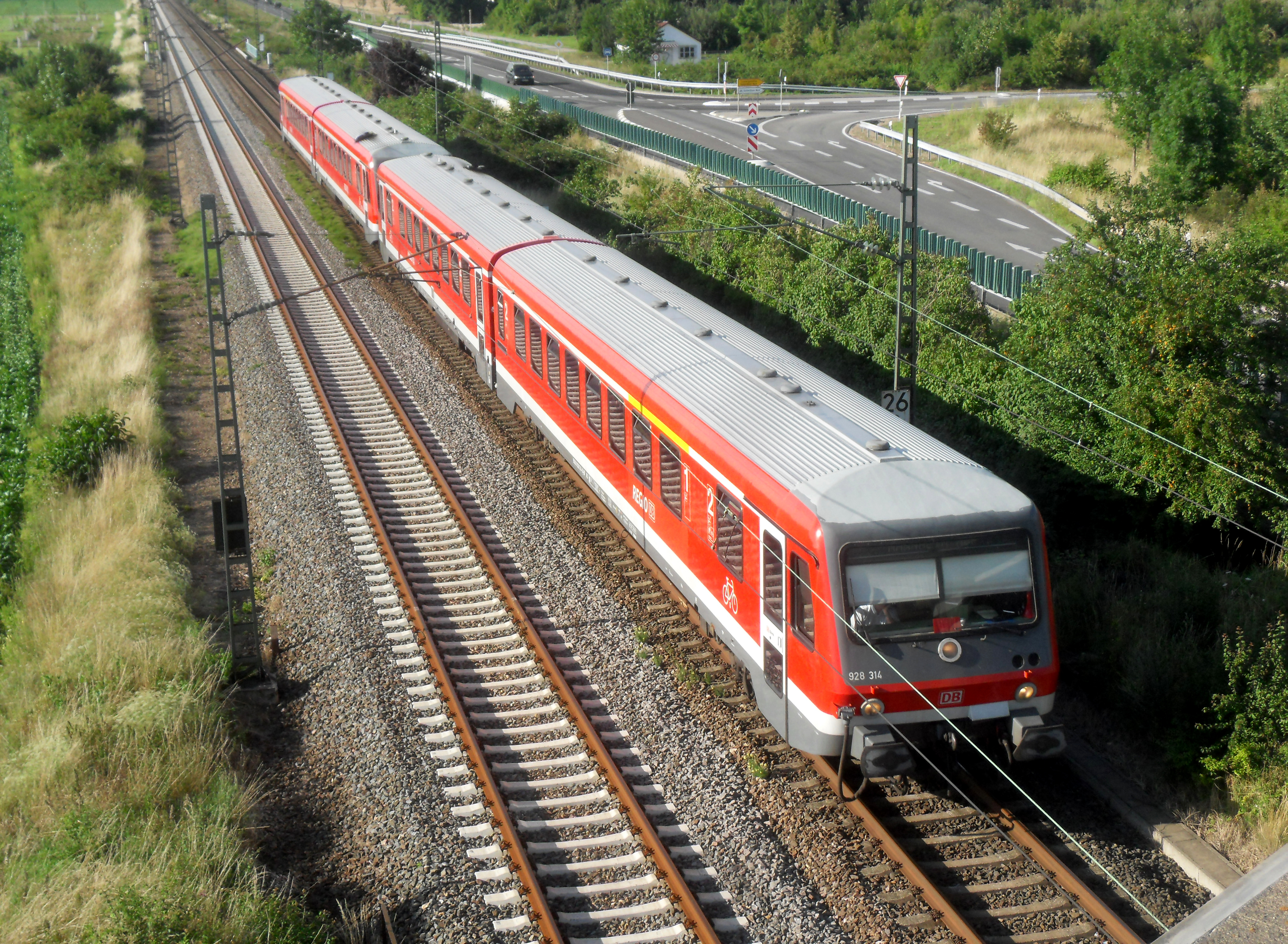
Double unit with 628 314 near Guntersblum

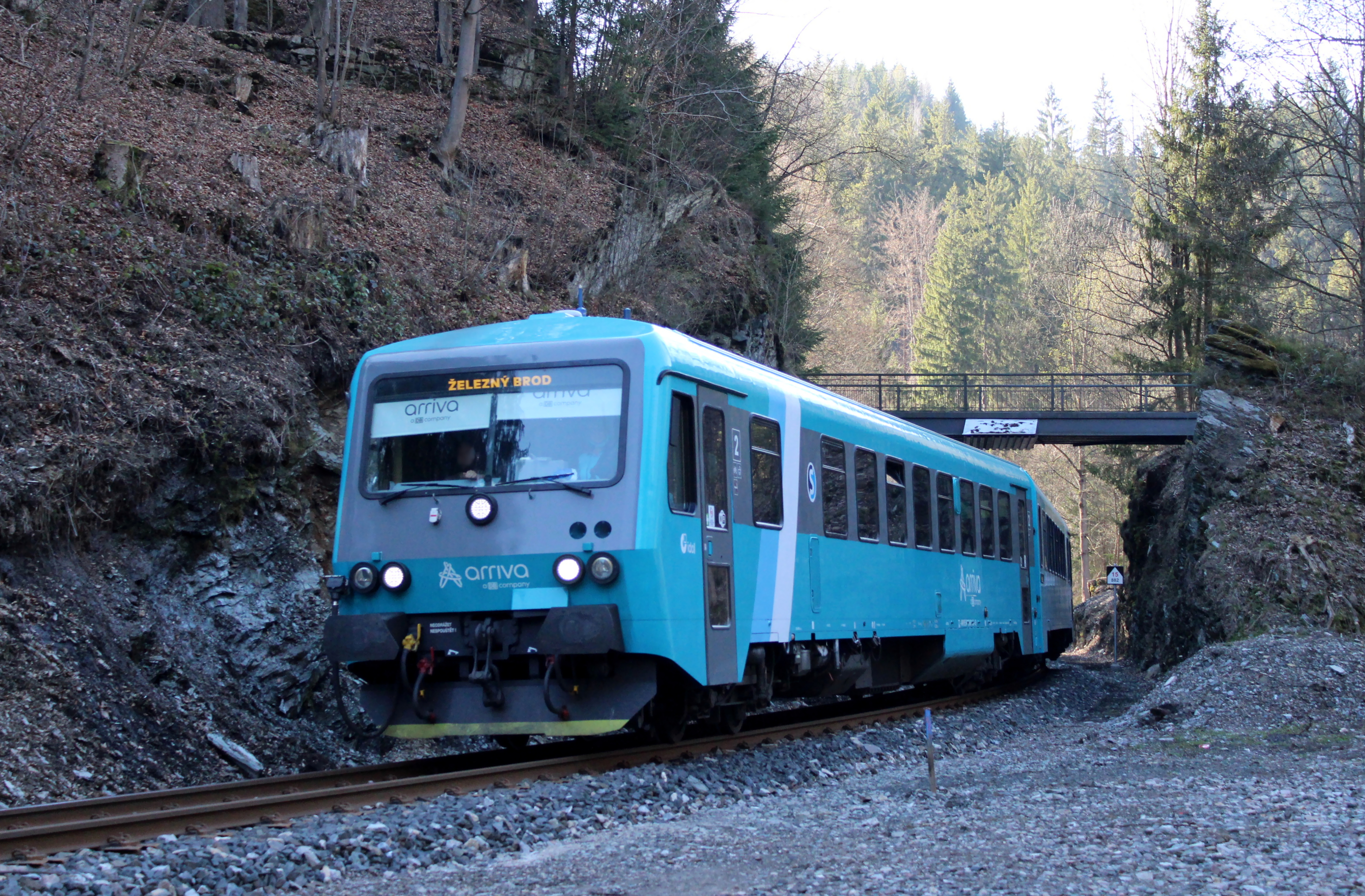
ex 628 at Návarov

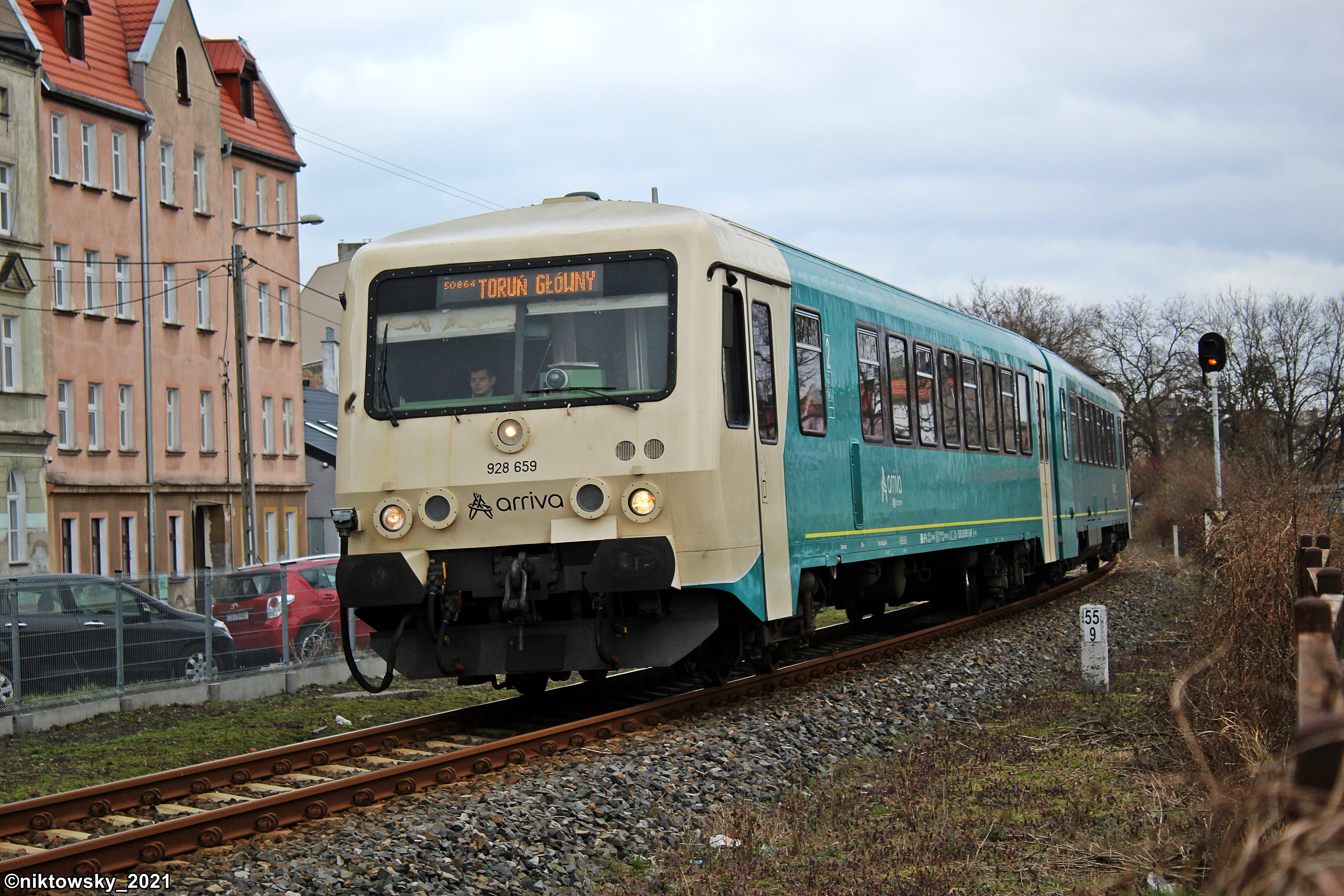
928 659 used by Arriva RP in Poland

== Sources ==
- Deutsche Bundesbahn: DV 987/323: Bedienungsanleitung für die Dieseltriebwagen 627.0 und 628.0.
- Andreas M. Räntzsch: Baureihe 627/628. - Stuttgart, Transpress, 2003. - ISBN 3-613-71202-4, pp. 41–44.
- Michael Gröbner: Baureihe 628.4. Im Führerstand. In: LOK MAGAZIN. Nr. 251/Jahrgang 41/2002. GeraNova Zeitschriftenverlag GmbH München, ISSN 0458-1822, pp. 50–52.
