= Nærum Line =

Railway line in Copenhagen, Denmark

Coordinates: 55.8093°N 12.5270°E

Nærumbanen
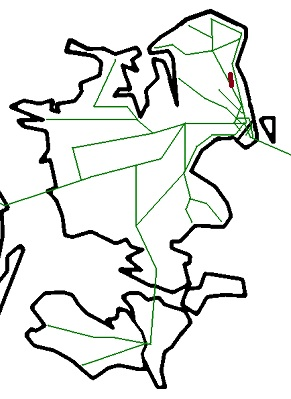

Overview
- Owner: Hovedstadens Lokalbaner
- Termini: Jægersborg; Nærum
- Stations: 8

Service
- Type: Railway
- System: Danish railways
- Operator(s): Lokaltog A/S
- Rolling stock: RegioSprinter

History
- Opened: 1900

Technical
- Line length: 7.8 km (4.8 mi)
- Number of tracks: Single
- Character: Commuter trains
- Track gauge: 1,435 mm (4 ft 8 1/2 in)
- Electrification: No
- Operating speed: 75 km/h (47 mph)

Nærumbanen is a short railway line in the northern suburbs of Copenhagen which serves mainly local neighborhoods in Kongens Lyngby in Lyngby-Taarbæk Municipality and Nærum in Rudersdal municipality. It is currently operated by the railway company Lokaltog A/S. Lokaltog runs frequent light trains that connect to the S-train system at Jægersborg.

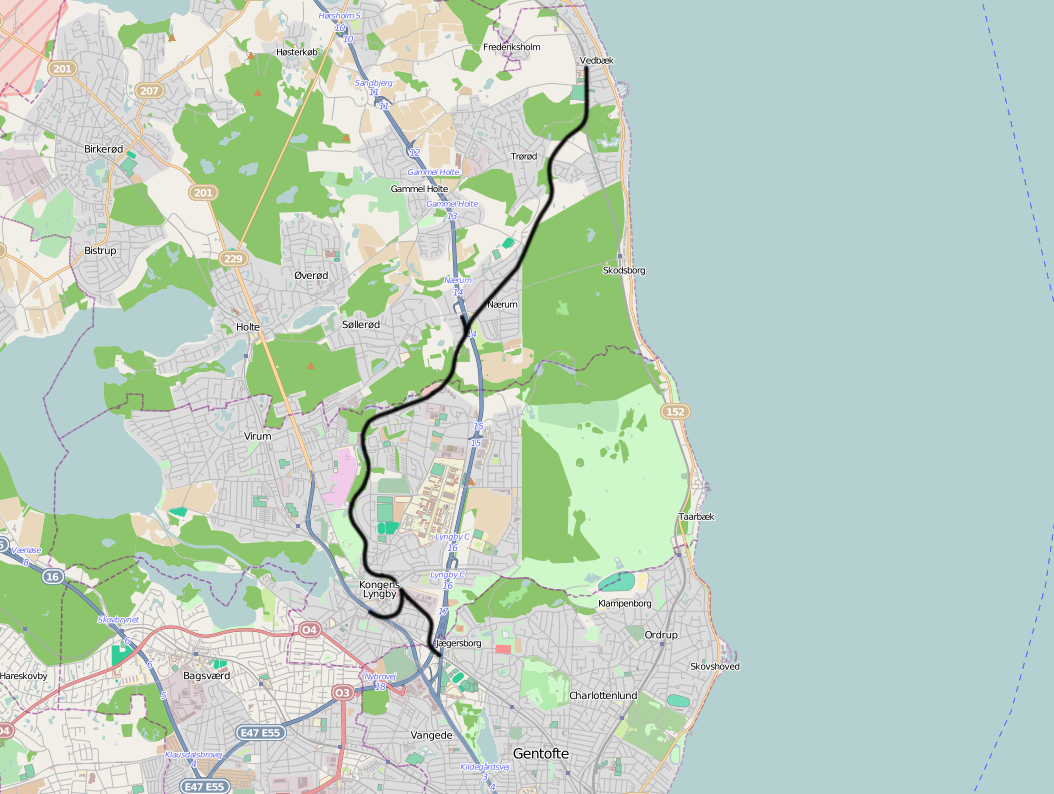
The alignment of the track, both the original and the current one.

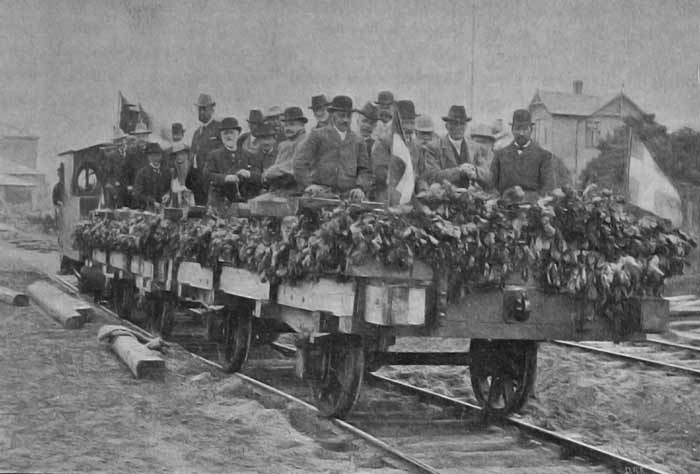
Inauguration of the Lyngby-Vedbæk Railway in 1900.

Nærumbanen, or Jægersborg-Nærum Railway, is a local railway, originally between Lyngby and Vedbæk, now between Jægersborg and Nærum. The course runs through scenic areas by Mølleåen. During rush hours the train runs every 10 minutes and most other times it runs every 20 minutes.

== History ==
The railway opened as Lyngby-Vedbæk railway in 1900 with an aim of serving the industries that had settled in the Mølleå valley to exploit the hydraulic power of the Mølleå. In the early years the railway moved freight for these customers, but today it has been a passenger-only railway for many years.

The northern half of the railway between Nærum and Vedbæk quickly proved unprofitable and was abandoned in 1923. In 1936 the southern terminus in Lyngby was moved to Jægersborg. The Nærum end of the line was shortened a bit in 1954 due to the construction of the Helsingør motorway.

== Stations ==
| Name | Opened | Comments |
|---|---|---|
| Jægersborg | 1936 | Transfer to S-trains |
| Nørgårdsvej | 2003 | |
| Lyngby Lokal | | Transfer to Greater Copenhagen Light Rail |
| Fuglevad | | |
| Brede | 1900 | |
| Ørholm | 1900 | |
| Ravnholm | | |
| Nærum | 1954 | Transfer to buses on the Helsingør motorway, including expresses 150S, 15E and 40E |

== Operations ==
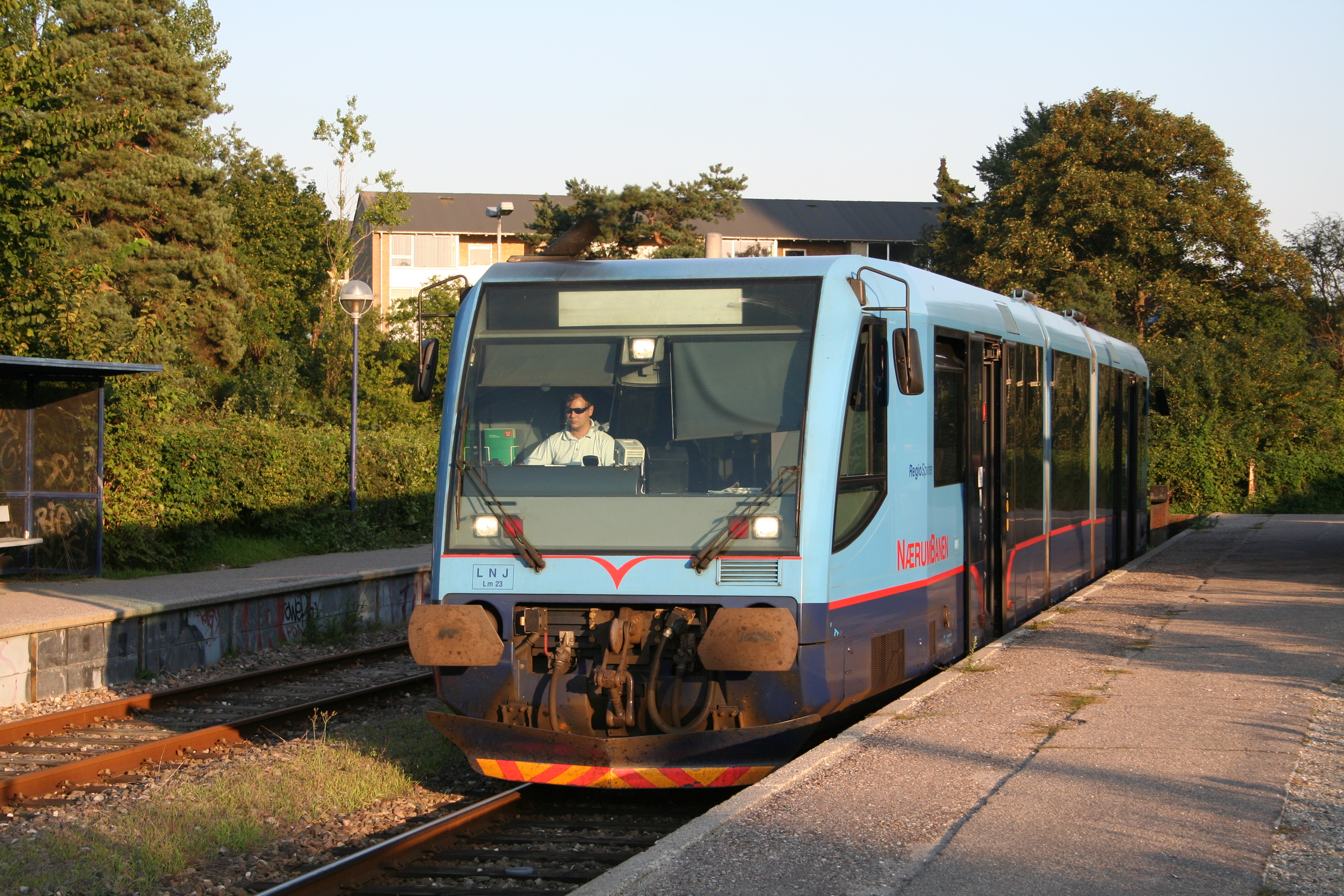
RegioSprinter train at Jægersborg station.

Trains on the Nærum Line are operated by the railway company Lokaltog. Despite being a single-track railway, Lokaltog operates an ambitious timetable on the Nærum Line with a 20-minute frequency most of the day. Trains pass each other at Fuglevad and Ørholm. All trains are Siemens RegioSprinter light diesel units.
