= Nærum railway station =

Railway station in Rudersdal Municipality, Denmark

Nærum
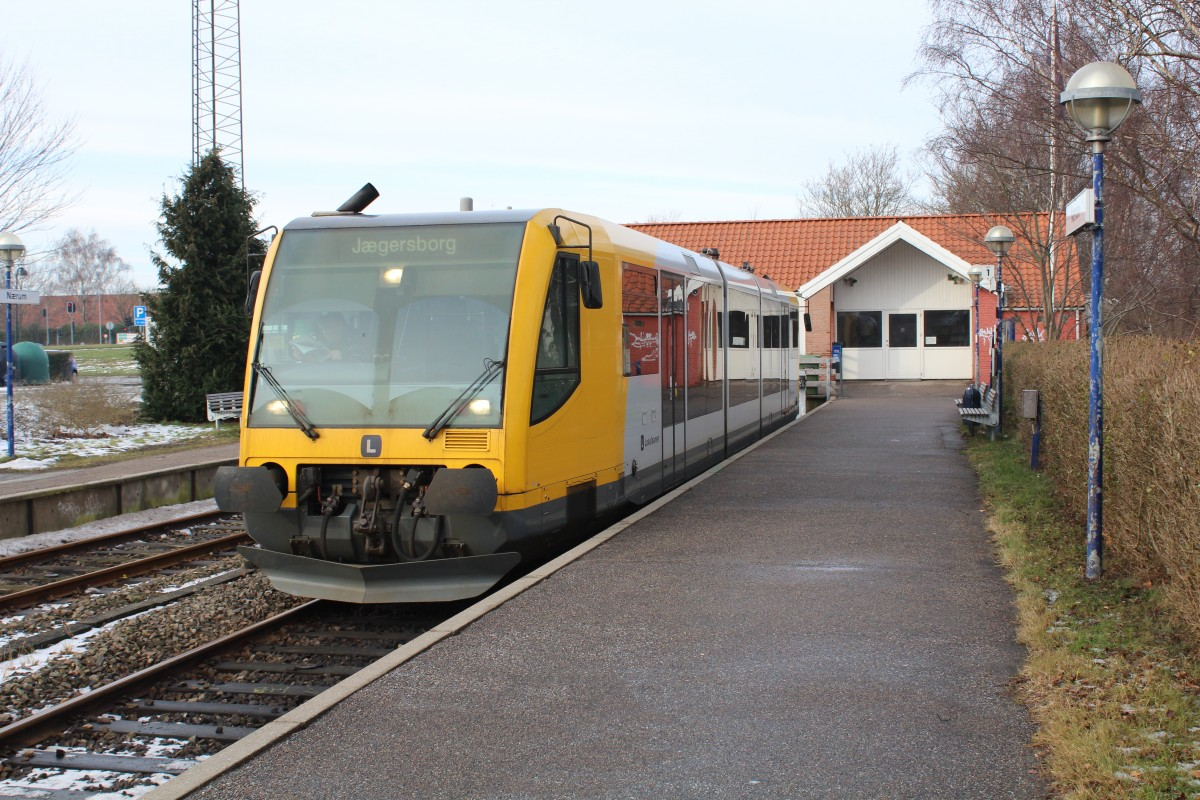
- Nærum railway station in 2014

General information
- Location: Langebjerg 1; 2850 Nærum; Rudersdal Municipality; Denmark
- Coordinates: 55°48′50″N 12°31′41.5″E
- Elevation: 26.4 metres (87 ft)
- Owner: Hovedstadens Lokalbaner
- Operator: Lokaltog
- Line: Nærum Line
- Platforms: 2
- Tracks: 2

History
- Opened: 25 August 1900
- Rebuilt: 1954

Services
Preceding station	Lokaltog	Following station
Terminus	Nærum Line Local train	Ravnholm towards Jægersborg
Location

Nærum station is a railway station serving the suburb of Nærum north of Copenhagen in North Zealand, Denmark.

Nærum station is the northern terminus of the Nærum railway line from Jægersborg to Nærum. The first Nærum station was opened in 1900 with the opening of the railway line between Kongens Lyngby and Vedbæk. The northern half of the railway line between Nærum and Vedbæk quickly proved unprofitable and was abandoned in 1923. The Nærum end of the line was shortened a bit in 1954 due to the construction of the Helsingør motorway, and Nærum station was moved to its current location. The train services are operated by the railway company Lokaltog which runs frequent local train services from the station to Jægersborg station that connect to the Copenhagen S-train system at Jægersborg.

== Cultural references ==
Nærum railway station is used as a location in the 1942 Danish comedy film Baby paa eventyr.

== See also ==
- List of railway stations in Denmark
