= Lyngby railway station =

Railway station in Lyngby-Taarbæk Municipality, Denmark

Lyngby
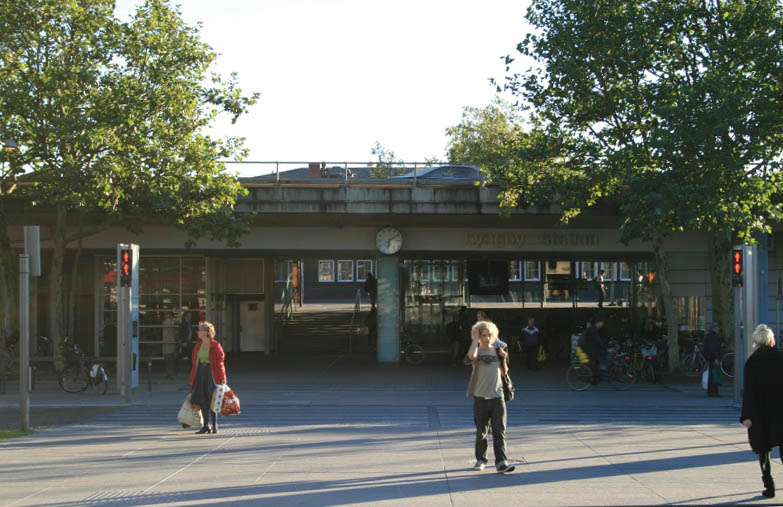
- Lyngby station in 2007

General information
- Location: Jernbanepladsen 47; 2800 Lyngby; Lyngby-Taarbæk Municipality; Denmark
- Coordinates: 55°46′06″N 12°30′10″E
- Elevation: 25.0 metres (82.0 ft)
- Owner: DSB (station infrastructure); Banedanmark (rail infrastructure)
- Lines: North Line; Nærum Line (1890–1936)
- Platforms: 1 island platform, 1 side platform
- Tracks: 3
- Train operators: DSB
- Connections: Bus terminal

Construction
- Structure type: At-grade
- Accessible: Yes
- Architect: Vilhelm Carl Heinrich Wolf (1863); Niels Peder Christian Holsøe (1891)

Other information
- Station code: Ly
- Website: Official website

History
- Opened: 1 October 1863; 162 years ago
- Rebuilt: 1891, 1957
- Electrified: 1936

Services
Preceding station	S-train	Following station
Holte towards Hillerød	A	Hellerup towards Hundige
Sorgenfri towards Hillerød	A Sat–Sun	Jægersborg towards Køge
Sorgenfri towards Holte	E Mon–Fri	Jægersborg towards Køge
Future services (2026)
Preceding station	Hovedstadens Letbane	Following station
Gammelmosevej towards Ishøj	Greater Copenhagen Light Rail	Lyngby Centrum towards Lundtofte
Location

Lyngby station is a railway station serving the town and suburb of Kongens Lyngby in Greater Copenhagen, Denmark. It is situated centrally in Kongens Lyngby, a short distance from its main artery Lyngby Hovedgade. With its large bus terminal, situated on the east side of the station, it is an important transport hub for public transport in the northern suburbs of Copenhagen.

Lyngby station is located on the Hillerød radial of Copenhagens S-train network, a hybrid commuter rail and rapid transit system serving Greater Copenhagen. It is served regularly by trains on the A- and E-lines which have a journey time to central Copenhagen of around 15 minutes.

The station opened in 1863. It has been served by the S-train network since 1936. The current station building was built in 1957 and contains a shopping arcade with circa 15 stores, including two supermarkets.

== History ==
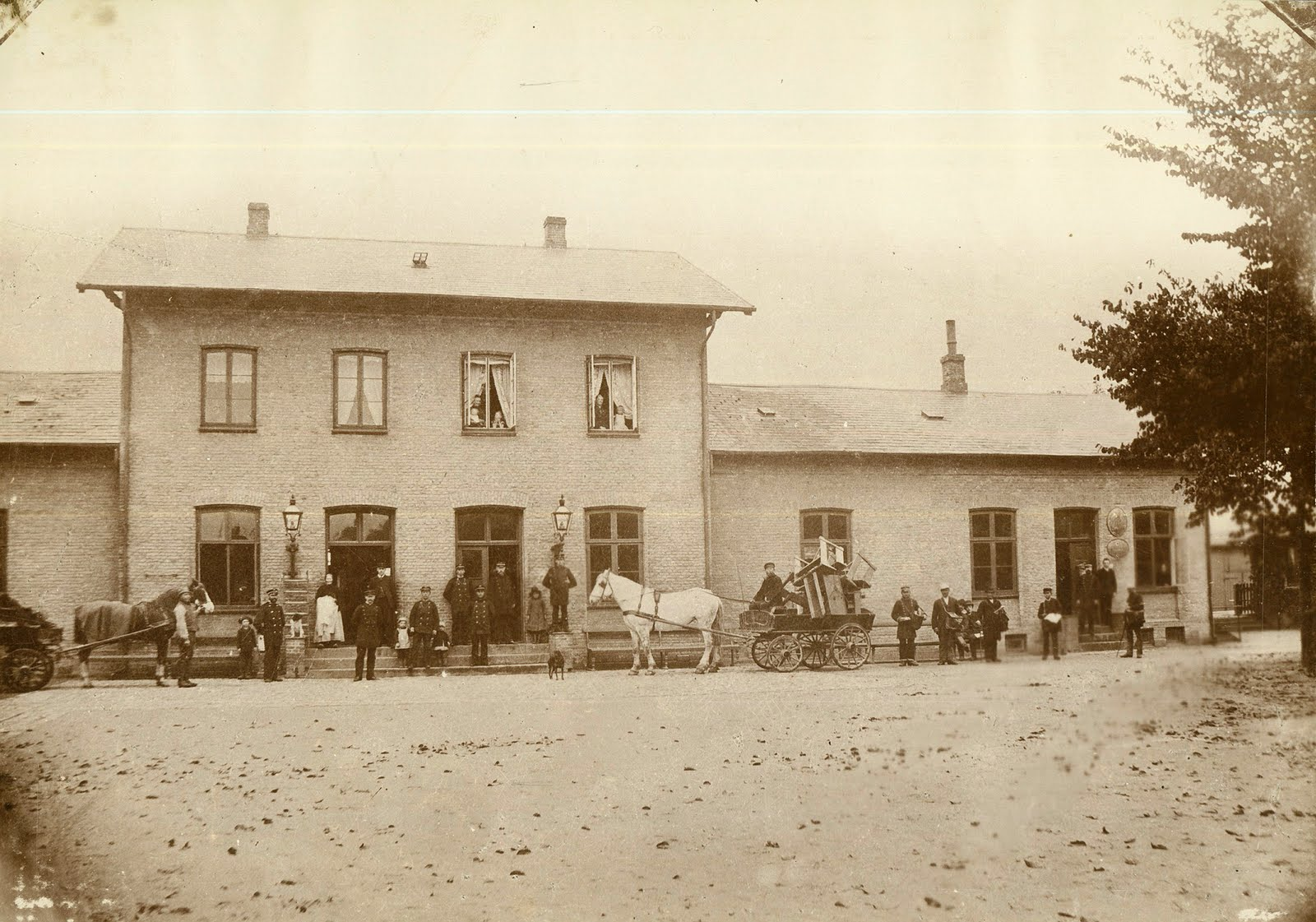
The first Lyngby Station

Lyngby Station opened on 1 October 1863 as the northern terminus of the first section of the North Line from Copenhagen to Lyngby. The small station building was designed by the Danish architect Vilhelm Carl Heinrich Wolf. The following year, the railway line was completed as the section from Lyngby to Helsingør via Hillerød opened. The Lyngby-Vedbæk Railway opened in 1890.

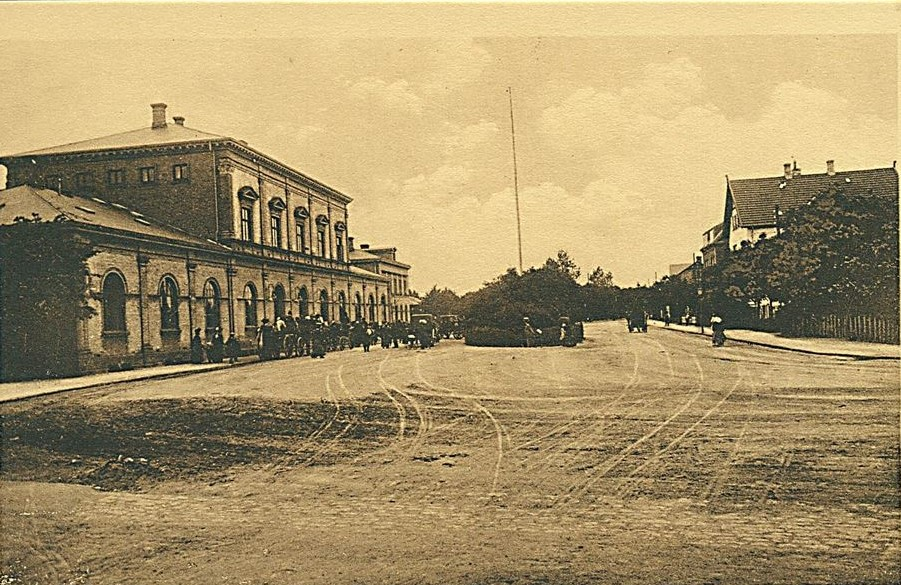
The second Lyngby Station

The first station building was demolished in connection with the introduction of double tracks between Hellerup and Holte. A new and larger station building, located a little to the south of the old one, was built in 1890–91 to design by Heinrich Wenck and Niels Peder Christian Holsøe.

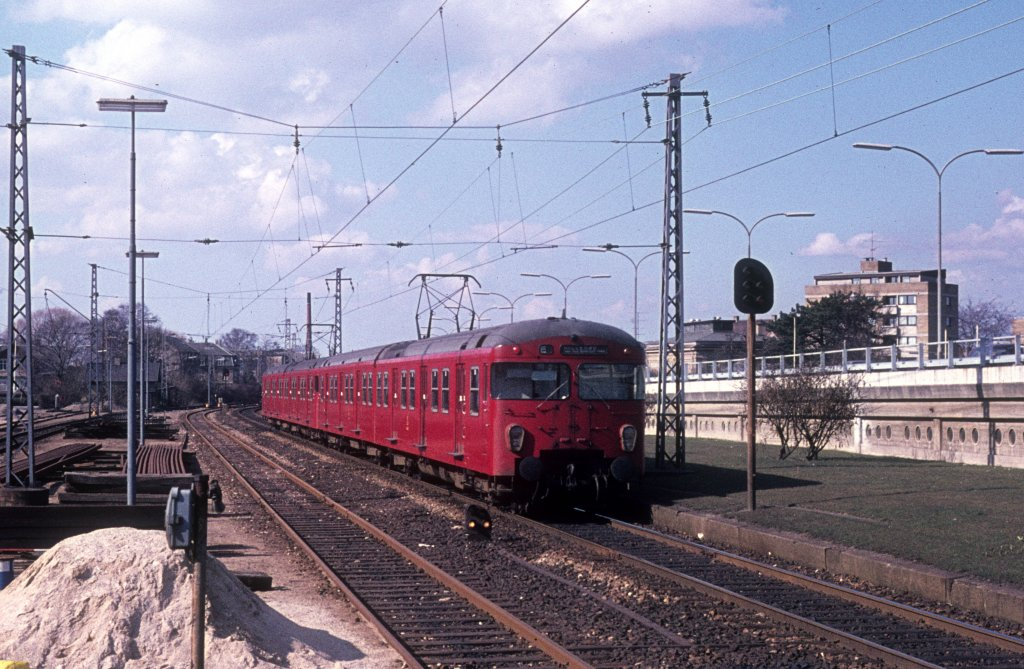
2nd generation S-train at Lyngby station in 1975.

The rail line was electrified and converted to S-train service in 1936. At the same time, the terminus of the Lyngby-Vedbæk Railway was moved south to Jægersborg.

The old station building was demolished in 1956, and replaced by the current structure which opened in 1957.

== Building ==
Lyngby Bypass runs along the roof of the station building which is located on the east side of the railway tracks. The building contains a 200 metre long shopping arcade with circa 15 shops with a total floor area of 8,369 square metres. In 2012, DSB Ejendomme acquired the shopping arcade from Lyngby-Taarbæk Municipality. It was subsequently refurbished with the assistance of Gottlieb Paludan Architects. The shopping arcade was acquired by Nordic Real Estate Partners (NREP) in 2014. Stores include two Fakta and Netto supermarket, a Matas and a Lagkagehuset bakery.

== Future developments ==
Construction has started of the Greater Copenhagen Light Rail, a planned electric light rail system crossing the lines of the S-train in Greater Copenhagen. It will connect Lundtofte with Ishøj and pass by Lyngby station. It is planned to start operating in year 2025.

== Number of travellers ==
According to the Østtællingen in 2008:

År	Antal	År	Antal	År	Antal	År	Antal
1957	-	1974	9.467	1991	11.720	2001	11.491
1960	-	1975	8.658	1992	12.056	2002	11.368
1962	-	1977	7.776	1993	12.039	2003	11.650
1964	-	1979	9.413	1995	12.276	2004	12.411
1966	-	1981	10.289	1996	12.786	2005	12.153
1968	9.828	1984	9.872	1997	12.738	2006	12.381
1970	10.152	1987	9.773	1998	12.549	2007	12.085
1972	10.556	1990	11.522	2000	12.793	2008	11.529

== See also ==
- List of Copenhagen S-train stations
- List of railway stations in Denmark
- Transport in Copenhagen
- Rail transport in Denmark
- History of rail transport in Denmark
- Transport in Denmark
