= GW Train Regio =

Czech railway operator

GW Train Regio a.s.
- Type: Joint-stock company
- Founded: 1992
- Headquarters: Ústí nad Labem, Czech Republic
- Area served: Czech Republic; Lower Silesian Voivodeship, Poland
- Services: Rail passenger transport
- Parent: GW JIHOTRANS a.s.
- Website: www.gwtr.cz

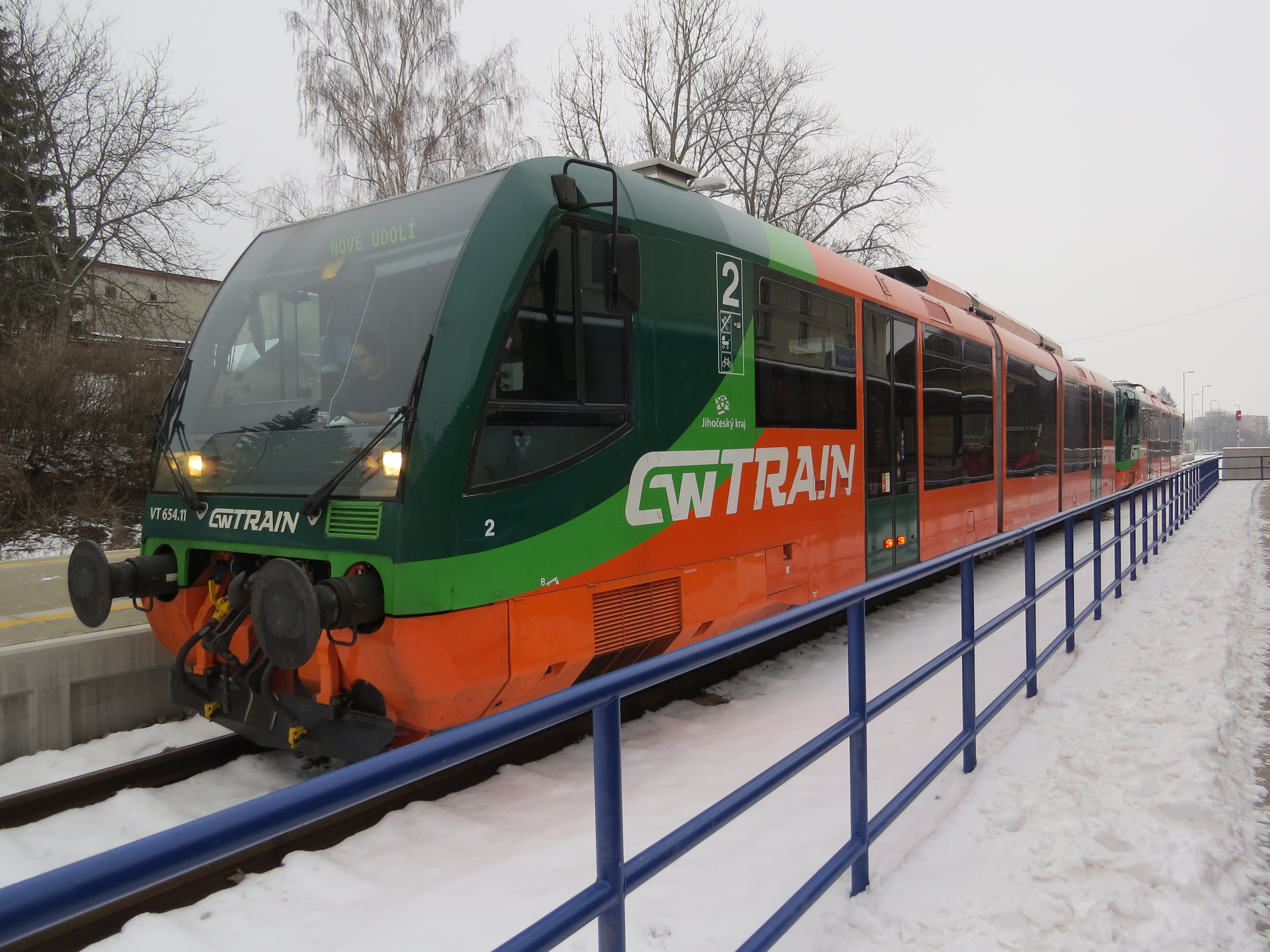
RegioSprinter regional train

GW Train Regio is a Czech railway company mainly engaged in the operation of passenger rail transport on regional lines.

== History ==
The company was formed from the passenger divisions of Viamont, a Czech rail operator. In 2008, Viamont Regio a.s. was established, to separate Viamont's freight and passenger operations, a process which was completed by 2011.

In December 2011, the company was purchased by the IDS building corporation a.s., who renamed the business to its current name, GW Train Regio.

The company was purchased again in 2014, by ČSAD JIHOTRANS a.s., who were renamed to GW JIHOTRANS a.s. in 2015.

== Services ==
GW Train Regio serve these regions:

=== Karlovy Vary Region ===
This region operates service 145, from Sokolov to Kraslice, and service 149, which runs from Karlovy Vary to Bečov nad Teplou, and Mariánské Lázně.

=== Route R25 Plzeň-Most ===
GW Train Regio operate route R25, from Plzeň to Most, under a 10-year contract from the Czech Ministry of Transport. This route uses former DB Class 628.2 trains, which were purchased from DB, and refurbished in 2016.

=== South Bohemian Region ===
South Bohemia operate 229 km of routes, under a 15-year contract from the Czech Ministry of Transport. These routes were due to commence operation under GWTR in December 2016, after winning the contract, above Arriva, and České dráhy, however, due to a legal challenge from ČD, this was delayed until December 2017.

=== Hradec Králové Region ===
GW Train Regio operate 3 routes in Hradec Králové Region, route 045, a 10 km route from Svoboda nad Úpou to Trutnov (where it connects with České dráhy trains to Hradec Králové and Prague), as well as 2 international routes to Poland - line D26, which operates between Trutnov and Sędzisław, and D28, which connects Adršpach and Wałbrzych.

=== Moravian-Silesian Region ===
GW Train Regio operate route 313 in the Moravian-Silesian Region, a 20 km route between Milotice nad Opavou and Vrbno pod Pradědem.

=== Plzeň Region ===
In December 2023, GW Train Regio commenced a 10 year contract awarded the council of the Plzeň Region to operate regional passenger services on the Southwest part 1 Pošumavi network from December 2023 replacing České dráhy.

== Fleet ==
GW Train Regio operate several types of trains, these include former Deutsche Bahn Class 628.2 trains, purchased and refurbished in 2016, which operate route R25, whilst other services are operated by Siemens-Duewag RegioSprinter trains, which were completely refurbished by CZ Loko adding air-conditioning, plug sockets, WiFi and a toilet. The fleet also contains some refurbished ČD Class 810s, as well as a few other second hand trains. In the past, the carrier operated one Stadler Regio-Shuttle RS1 marked as a series 650. Later Stadler's railcar is sold to Germany.

Picture	Class	Type Name	Number Owned	Comments	Reference
	654	Siemens-Duewag RegioSprinter RVT	15		
	810		6		
	814.5		1		
	817	Kolzam RegioVan	2	Formally Koleje Śląskie class SA109	
	845	DB Class 628	2	Formally Deutsche Bahn Class 628.2	
