= Jægersborg railway station =

Railway station in Gentofte Municipality, Denmark

Jægersborg
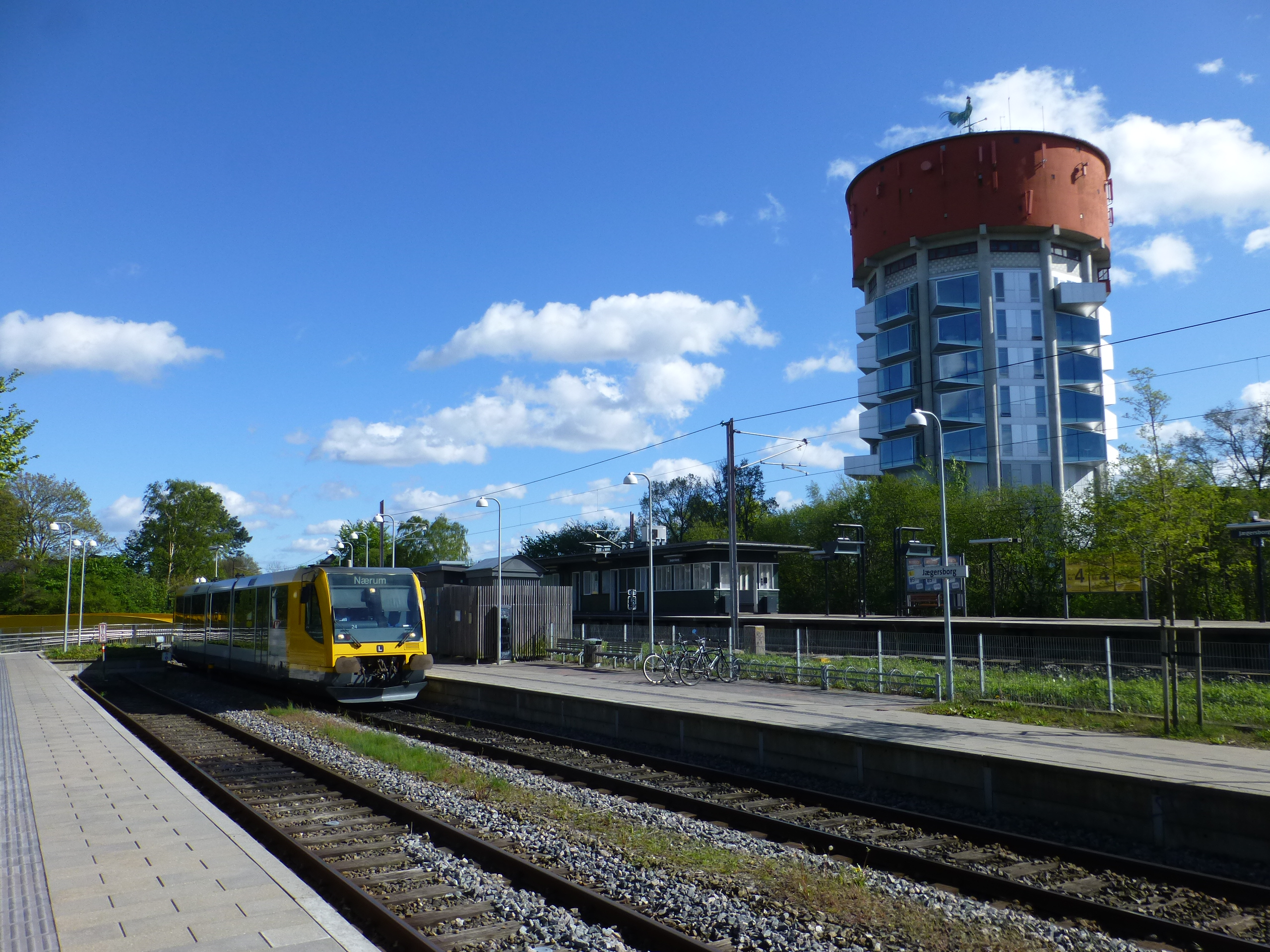
- Jægersborg station in 2015

General information
- Location: Jægersborgvej 128; 2820 Gentofte; Gentofte Municipality; Denmark
- Coordinates: 55°45′42″N 12°31′18″E
- Elevation: 30.8 metres (101 ft)
- Owner: DSB (station infrastructure); Banedanmark (rail infrastructure)
- Lines: North Line; Nærum Line
- Tracks: 4
- Train operators: DSB; Lokaltog
- Connections: Nærumbanen

History
- Opened: May 15, 1936; 90 years ago

Services
Preceding station	S-train	Following station
Lyngby towards Holte	E Mon–Fri	Gentofte towards Køge
Lyngby towards Hillerød	A Sat–Sun	Gentofte towards Køge
Preceding station	Lokaltog	Following station
Nørgaardsvej towards Nærum	Nærum Line Local train	Terminus
Location

Jægersborg station is a railway station serving the suburb of Jægersborg in Gentofte Municipality north of Copenhagen, Denmark. The station is located on the Hillerød radial of the S-train network in Copenhagen, Denmark, served by the E and A-train. It is also the southern terminus of the Nærumbanen local railway.

There are two distinct sets of platforms for each service. The S-train has double tracks and an island platform. Although there are two tracks with platforms on either side for the local Nærumbanen service, because it is the terminus of the single track line, only the closer southerly platform is regularly used.

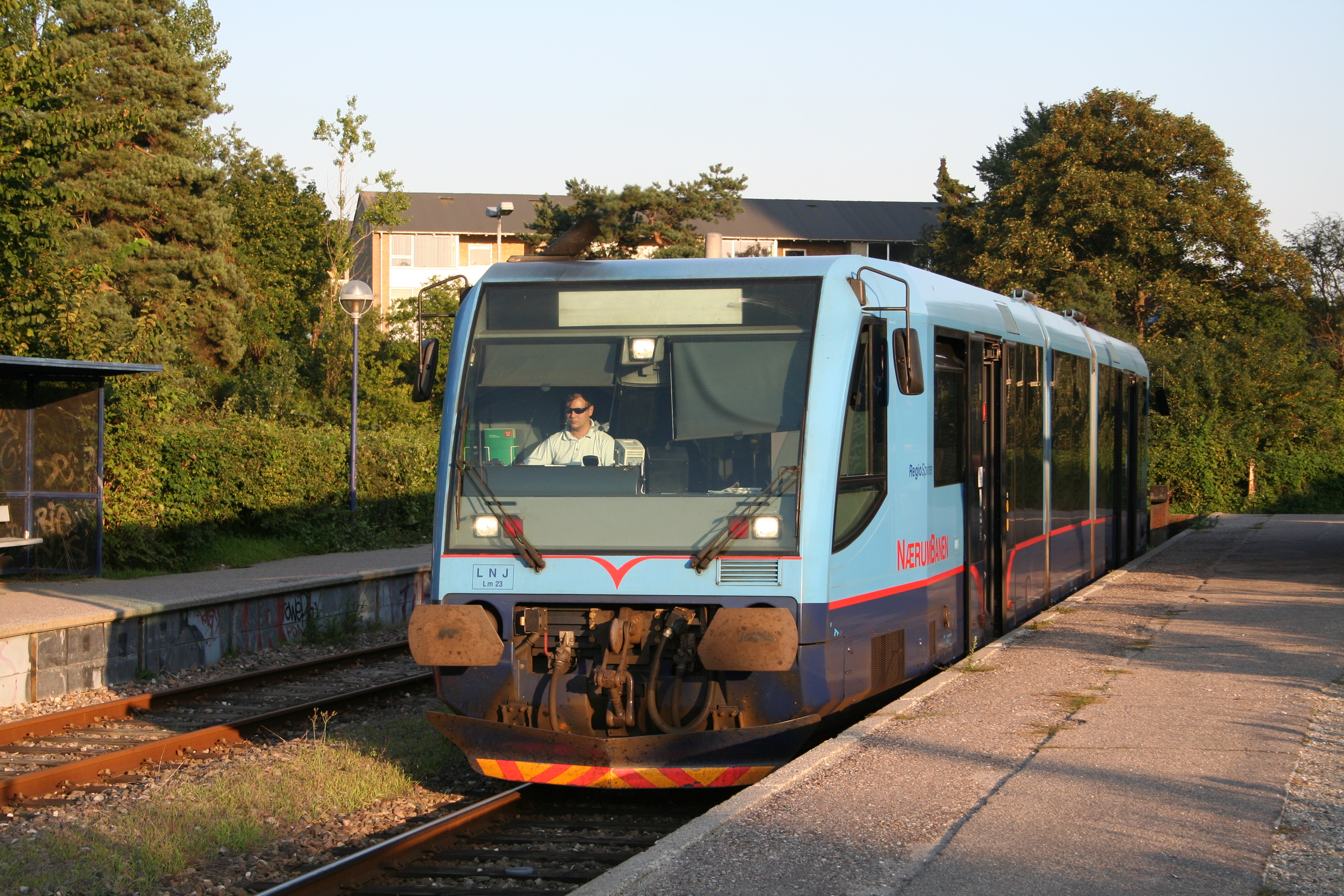
A Nærumbanen local RegioSprinter train, just before it departs from the station

== Number of travellers ==
According to the Østtællingen in 2008:

År	Antal	År	Antal	År	Antal	År	Antal
1957	-	1974	1.998	1991	882	2001	712
1960	-	1975	1.100	1992	849	2002	1.659
1962	-	1977	900	1993	998	2003	1.566
1964	-	1979	783	1995	789	2004	1.544
1966	-	1981	777	1996	737	2005	1.494
1968	3.027	1984	841	1997	722	2006	1.804
1970	2.492	1987	667	1998	727	2007	1.733
1972	2.098	1990	896	2000	685	2008	1.785

== See also ==
- List of Copenhagen S-train stations
- List of railway stations in Denmark
