= Nærum =

District in Rudersdal Municipality, Denmark

Coordinates: 55°49′N 12°33′E

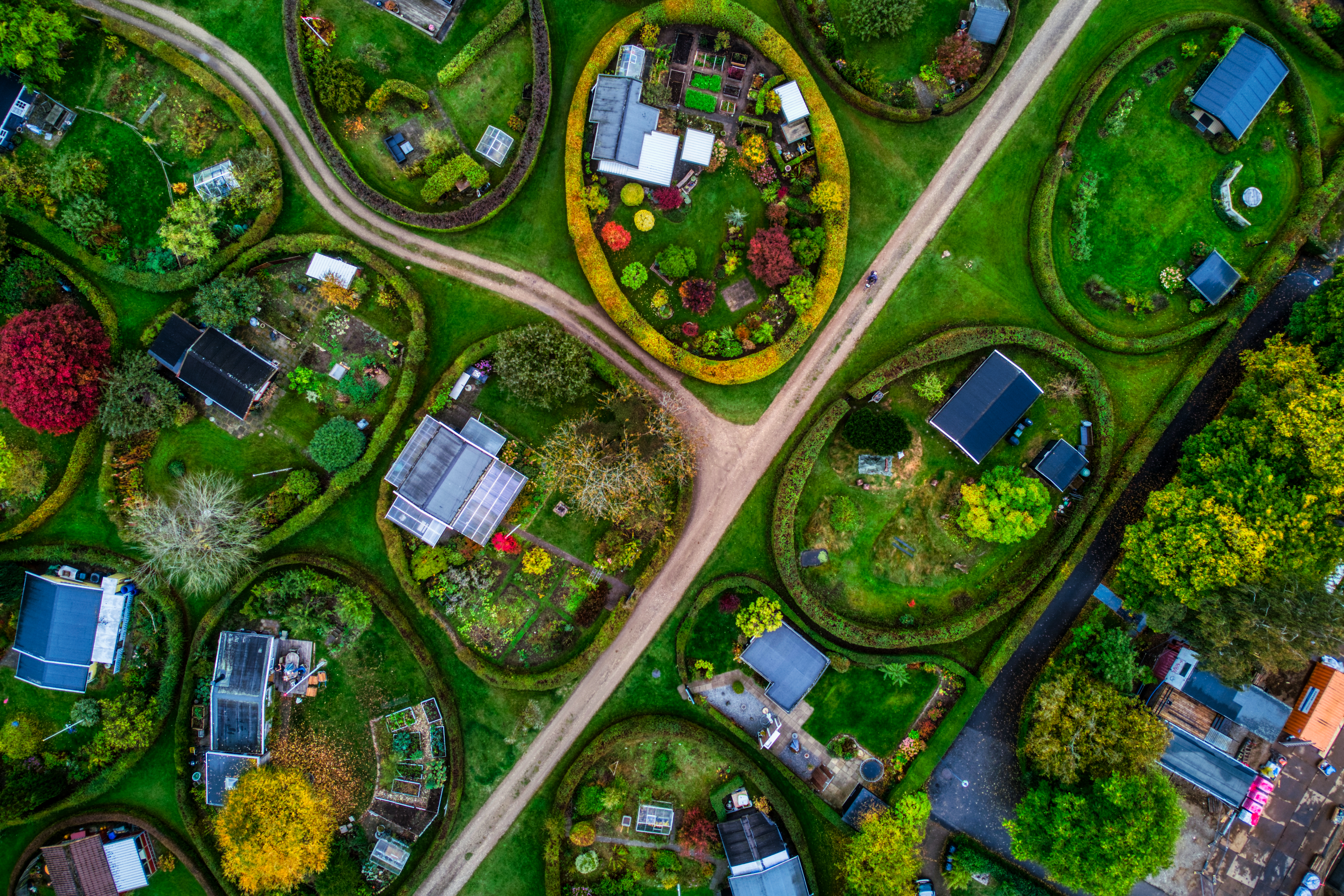
The Oval Allotment Gardens, Nærum

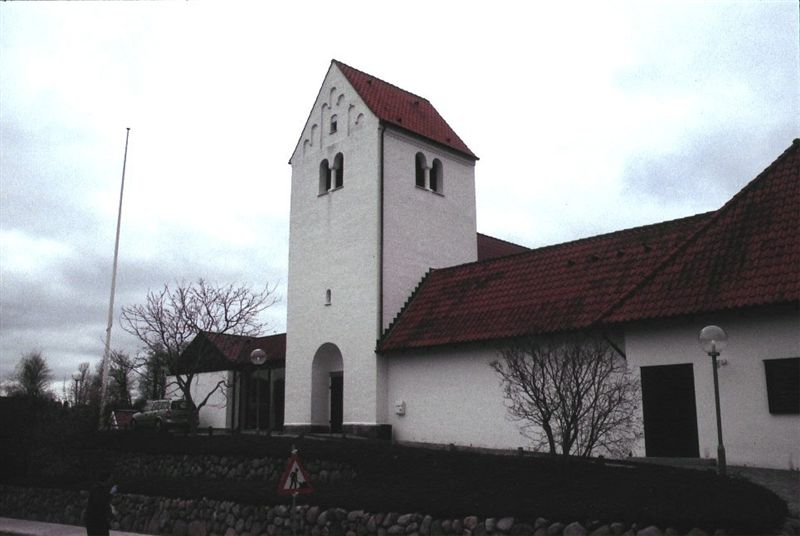
Nærum Church

Nærum (Danish pronunciation: [ˈneːʁɔm]) is a suburban district in Rudersdal Municipality in the northern outskirts of Copenhagen, Denmark. Quartered by the Helsingør Motorway running north–south and Skodsborgvej running east–west, Nærum is bounded by Jægersborg Hegn on the south and east, Geel's Forest on the west, open fields on the north and the Søllerød district on the northwest. 5,230 people live in the parish of Nærum, most of them in low-rise concrete blocks or single-family houses.

== History ==
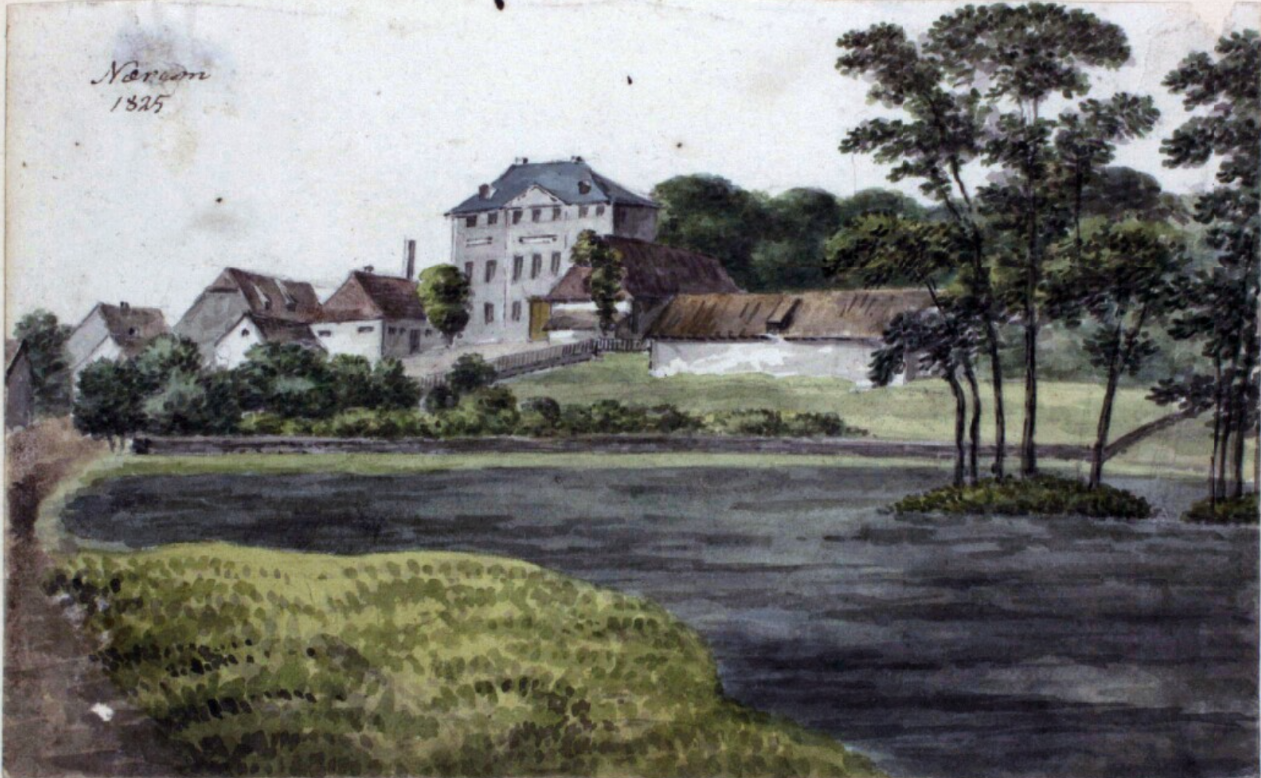
Nærum in 1825 by Ole Jørgen Rawert

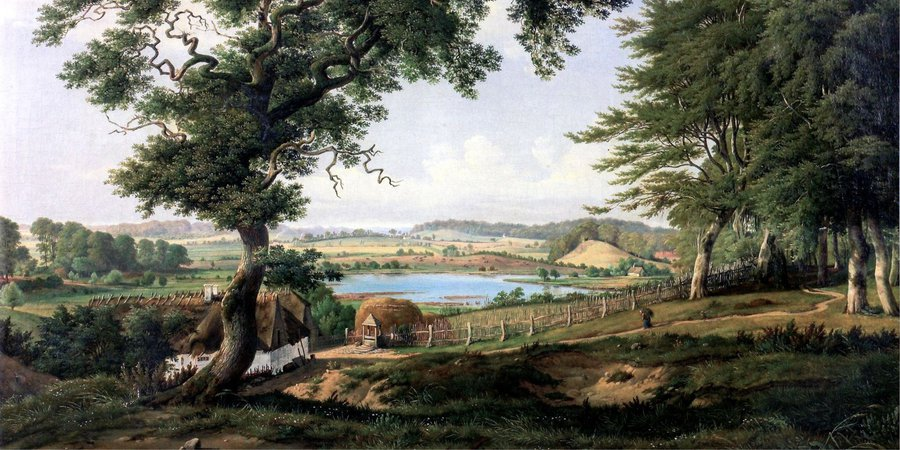
Rundforbi in Nærum painted by F.C. Kiærskou in 1834

A village has been there at least since the Iron Age, but the name Nærum was first recorded in 1186 when Bishop Absalon gave all his holdings, including Nærum, to Roskilde. It is believed that the name refers to his home Nóatún, the home of the god Njörðr, a Norse god associated with sea, seafaring, wind, fishing, wealth, and crop fertility.

Traces of people and human activity have been found on the Nærum plain and in the Nærum area since the Peasant Stone Age. A looped long dolmen, two coffins and a few parts of flint tools dating back to the Stone Age were found on Pueholm. From the Bronze Age, many burial mounds in the area (existing as well as looped) indicate human habitation. Some of the mounds, however, were originally from the Stone Age, but were recycled in the Bronze Age and in the investigated mounds, skeletal remains and flint tools from the Stone Age as well as a Bronze sword from the Bronze Age have been found. The current village itself called Nærum has existed since the Iron Age. The oldest part of the city is located around the street pond and up the hill to the main street.

The estate Nærumgård was founded by Frederik Ludvigh Lemwigh, who was manager of the royal estates Frederiksdal and Dronninggård. A later owner, Peter Borre, brought more land under the estate and built a new main building between 177^{??} and 1781. Christian Colbiørnsen, who owned Nærumgård from 1781 to 1806, increased the estate further. In 1888 it was converted into an orphanage and the land was sold off to the municipality in 1906.

Nærum was not disjoined from the parish of Søllerød until 1932.

== Landmarks ==
The district has a gymnasium called Nærum Gymnasium built in 2003.

The multinational corporation engineering company Brüel & Kjær previously had its headquarters in Nærum.

Nærumvænge Torv is a shopping centre built between 1951 and 1958 to a design by Palle Suenson.

== Transport ==
Nærum railway station is the terminus of Nærumbanen, a single track railway line which connects the suburb with central Lyngby and Jægersborg station.
