= RegioSprinter =

German railcar

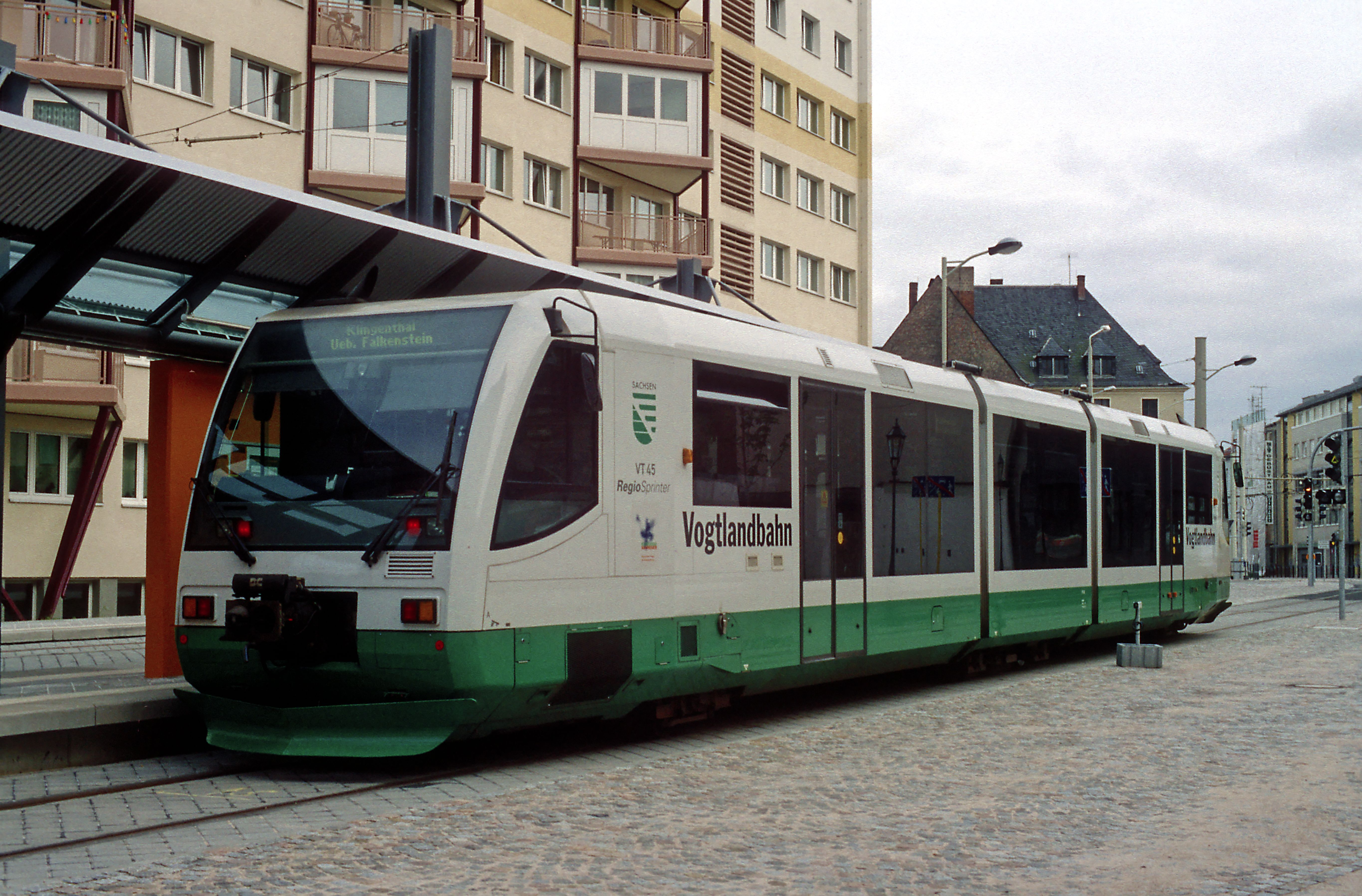
- Manufacturer: Siemens/Duewag
- Constructed: 1995–1999
- Number built: DKB/Rurtalbahn: 17; Vogtlandbahn: 18; Nærumbanen: 4

Specifications
- Train length: 24.800 m (81 ft 4 3/8 in) over couplers
- Height: 3,350 mm (10 ft 11 7/8 in)
- Maximum speed: 120 km/h (75 mph)
- Weight: 49.2 t (48.4 long tons; 54.2 short tons)
- Prime mover: 2× MAN D2865 LUH05
- Power output: Rurtalbahn: 2×198 kW (269 PS; 266 hp); Nærumbanen: 2×228 kW (310 PS; 306 hp)
- Acceleration: 1.1 m/s^{2} (3.6 ft/s^{2})
- UIC classification: A+2+A
- Braking systems: Electromagnetic rail brake; Retarder; Spring-loaded parking brake
- Track gauge: 1,435 mm (4 ft 8 1/2 in)

The RegioSprinter is a German diesel railcar built by Siemens-Duewag for rapid regional railway services. Originally the RegioSprinter was designated as a Regional Combustion-engined Railbus (Regional-Verbrennungstriebwagen or RVT) by Duewag.

Developed as prototypes for fast regional railway services on the plains, the RegioSprinter still has the fastest acceleration of any multiple unit or railbus in Germany. Due to several technical and conceptual defects, however, only very few were built. Based on their experience with the Regiosprinter Siemens developed its successor, the Desiro, which was initially marketed as the Regiosprinter 2.

In 1999, all the Vogtlandbahn vehicles were converted to meet tramway regulations (BO Strab), in order to be able to transfer to a tram line in the centre of Zwickau.

== Design ==
The vehicles are designed with three sections. In the two, single-axled end modules are the driver's cabs and the drive units like those on trams. In the middle is a twin-axled, unmotored module.

Two thirds of the vehicle has a low floor. The seats are arranged in a 2+3 configuration (Seats in some trains, like the ones operated by Lokaltog on Nærumbanen are arranged in a 2+2 configuration), there is no toilet due to the short journey distances envisaged. Late the Vogtlandbahn had to fit all its vehicles with toilets, because otherwise cross-border services to the Czech Republic would not have been possible. The first was launched in March 1995. One was sent to North America and began a five month trial with Calgary Transit, before being shipped to California for a United States tour visiting 25 cities including Austin, Indianapolis, San Jose, Tampa, Orlando, and Raleigh.

== Operations ==
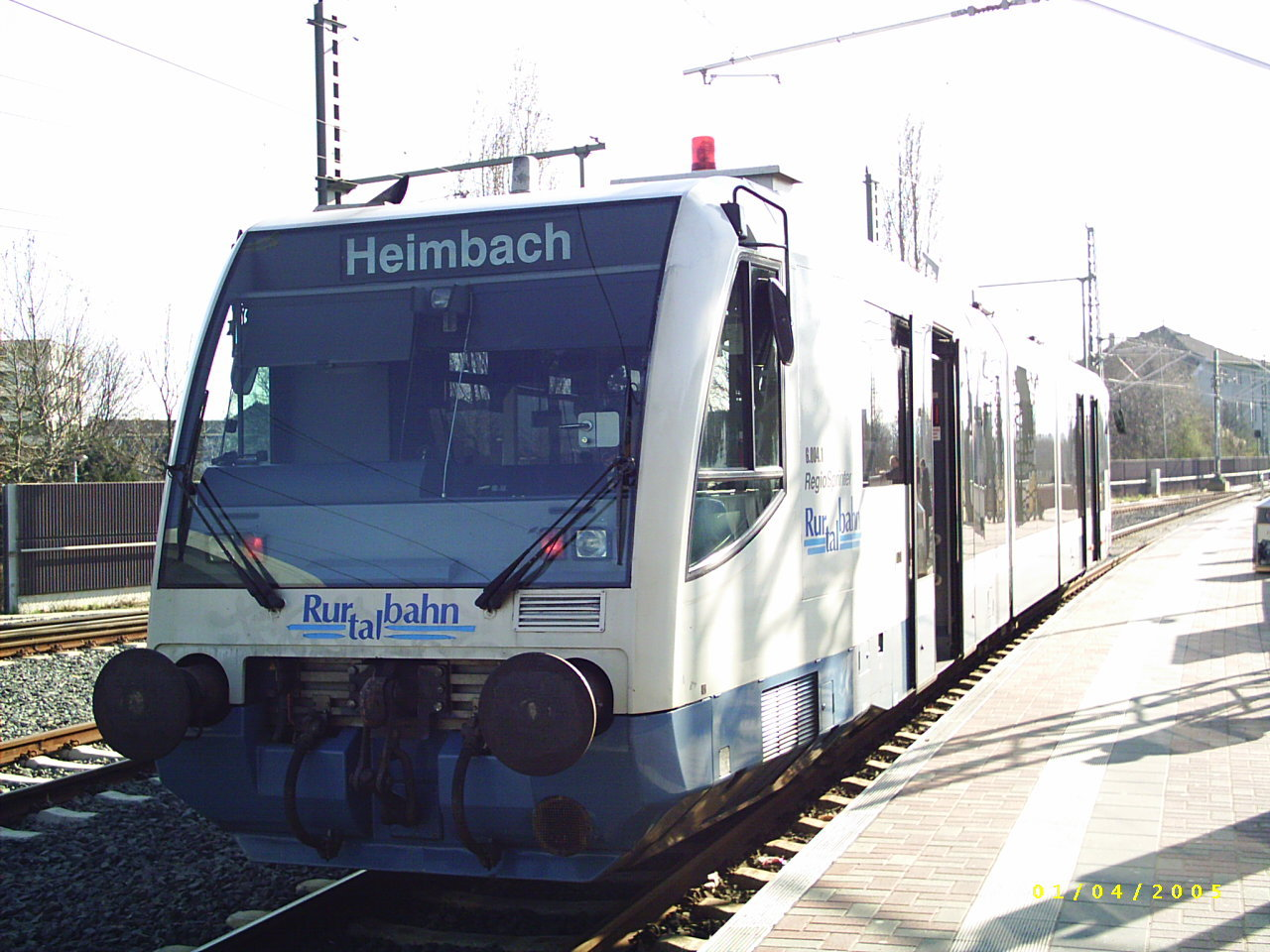
A Rurtalbahn railbus ready to depart at Düren Hbf

=== Rurtalbahn ===
In 1995 the Dürener Kreisbahn bought a total of 17 RegioSprinter for the Rurtalbahn (Rur Valley Railway), which were deployed to the two sections of line radiating from Düren, replacing the Uerdingen railbuses. Today (as at 2006), RegioSprinter are used on the following lines:

- Southern Rurtalbahn: Düren – Heimbach
- Northern Rurtalbahn: Düren – Jülich – Linnich (from Jülich part of the Jülich–Dalheim railway)
- Börde railway: Düren – Zülpich – Euskirchen (exclusively tourist traffic at weekends)

Under contract to DB Regio NRW there is also a railbus in service on the RB 39 route (Schwalm-Nette-Bahn) between Mönchengladbach Hbf and Dalheim.

Because the vehicle fleet of the Rur Valley railway has a large reserve, in past years RegioSprinters from this company have helped out on other private railways, for example on the Dortmund-Märkischen Eisenbahn, the Nord-Ostsee-Bahn and the VIAS.

=== Vogtlandbahn ===
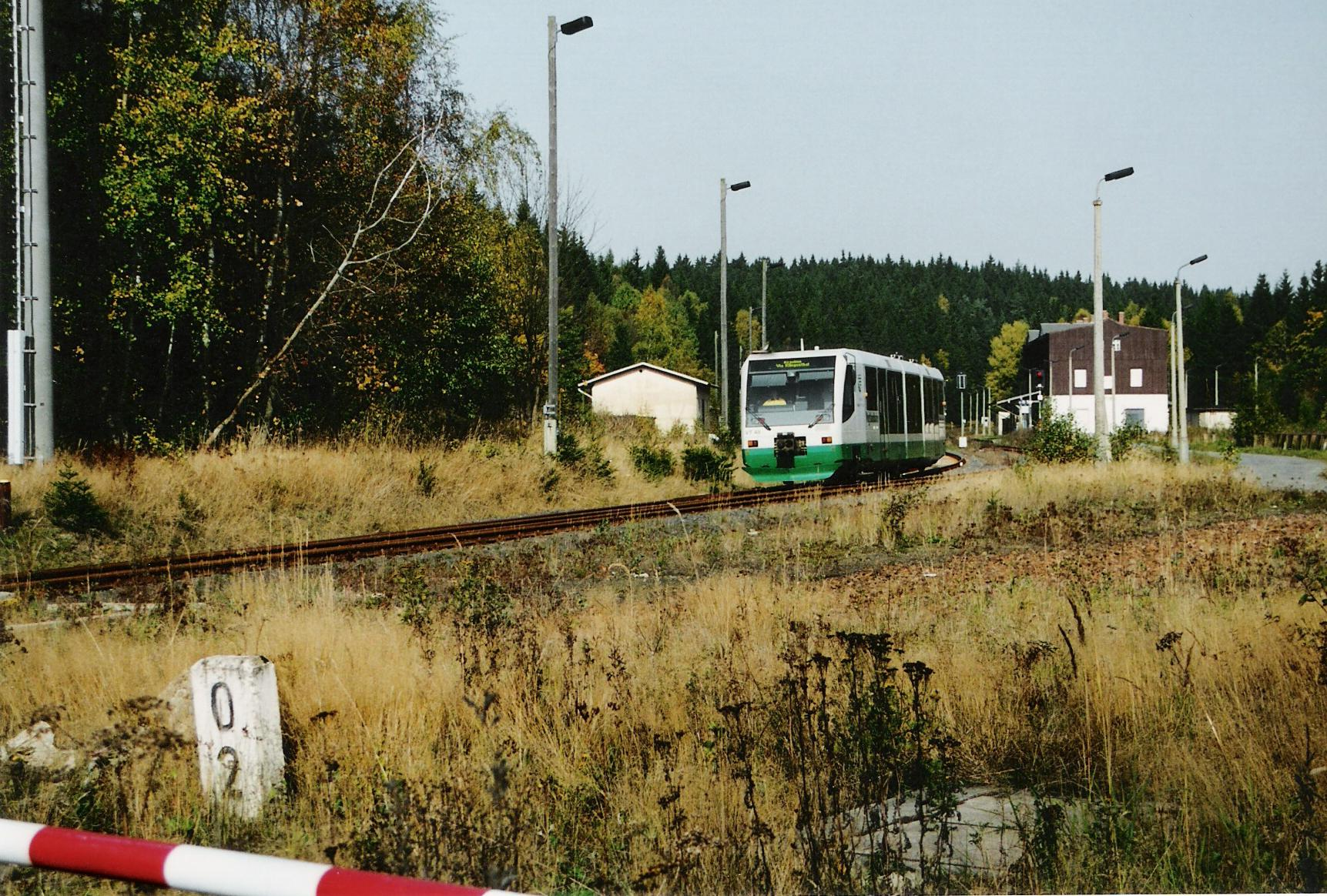
VBG in Zwotental

From 1996 the Vogtlandbahn bought a total of 18 vehicles for use on the lines from Zwickau to Adorf/Vogtl. and Reichenbach im Vogtl. to Klingenthal. Because the completion of these routes was repeatedly delayed after their refurbishment, the new vehicles initially worked the line from Zwickau to Bad Brambach. At present the railbuses are in services on the following Vogtlandbahn lines:

- RB 1 Zwickau Zentrum – Zwickau (Sachs) Hbf – Falkenstein/Vogtl. – Zwotental – Klingenthal – Kraslice (– Karlovy Vary dolní n.) (KBS 539)
- RB 2 Zwickau (Sachs) Hbf – Reichenbach (Vogtl) ob Bf – Herlasgrün – Plauen (Vogtl) ob Bf – Adorf/Vogtl. (KBS 544)
- RB 5 Hof – Schönberg/Vogtl. – Mehltheuer – Plauen (Vogtl) ob Bf – Herlasgrün – Falkenstein/Vogtl. – Zwotental – Adorf (Vogtl)

Until the timetable change in December 2006 the Vogtlandbahn's RegioSprinters were also on duty on the VB 7 line between Schönberg/Vogtland and Schleiz West. Services on this route were withdrawn on 9 December 2006 by the local public transport company of the free state of Thuringia.

Moreover, in 2006 two of the railbuses (VT 36 and VT 39) were hired to the Prignitz railway, which used them on their lines in the western Ruhrgebiet due to a shortage of stock.

=== Nærumbanen (Denmark) ===
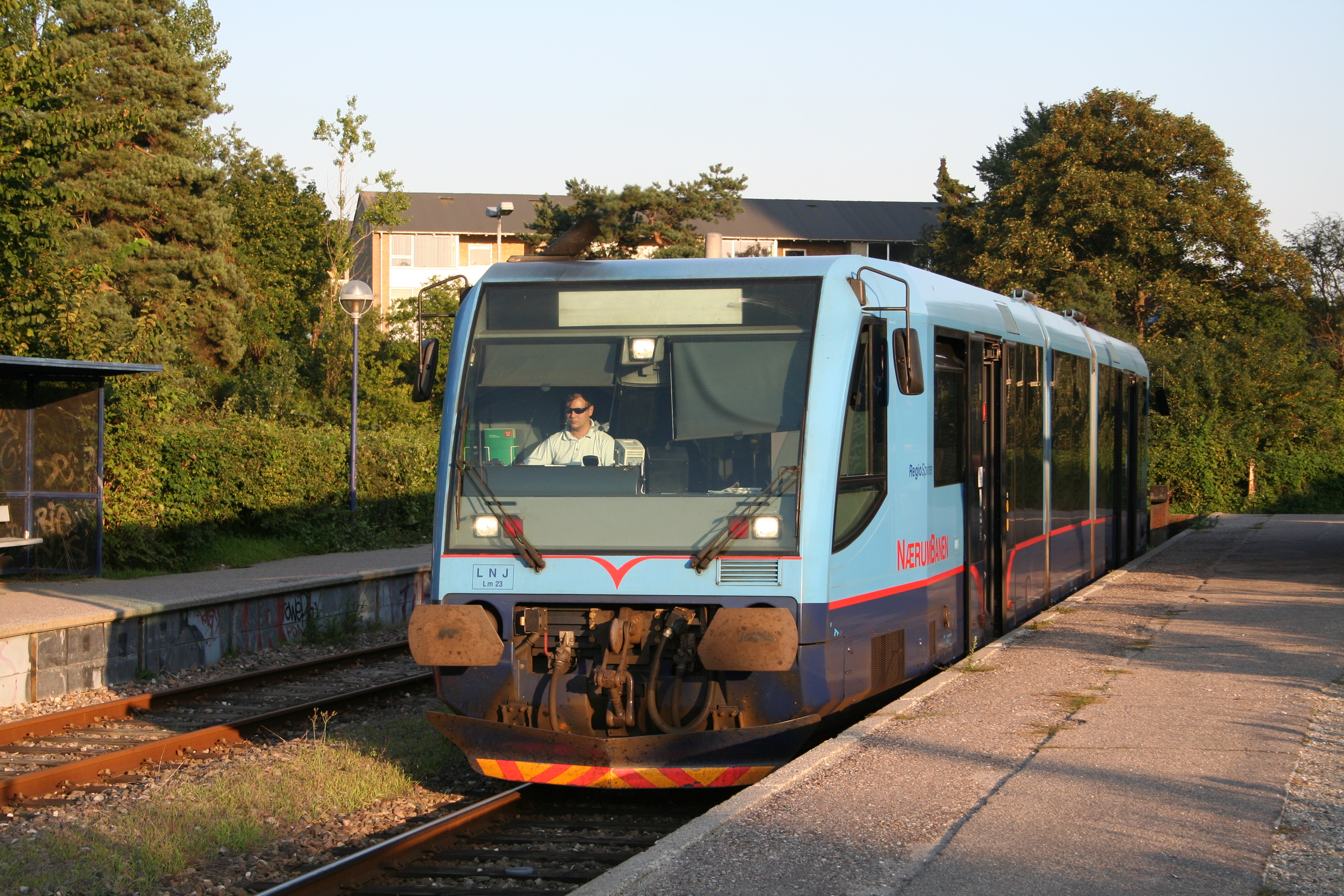
A RegioSprinter of the Nærumbanen

In 1999 the Nærumbanen (LNJ) in the Copenhagen area bought four RegioSprinter railbuses and deployed them on the line between Nærum and Jægersborg.

From 2002-2015 operations were run by Lokalbanen A/S (LB), which took over several smaller railway companies in the Copenhagen area. The railbuses were owned at the time by the Hovedstadens Lokalbaner, which hired them to the LB.

In 2015, the merger between Lokalbanen and Regionstog resulted in the formation of Lokaltog. Since 2015, Nærumbanen has been run by Lokaltog.

=== GW Train Regio (Czechia) ===
Since 2016, 15 units were purchased and operated by a Czech private operator GW Train Regio (previously known as Viamont, a.s.), who operated the route Karlovy Vary – Mariánské Lázně since 2006 with Regiosprinter units rented from Vogtlandbahn. Purchased units (11 from Rurtalbahn, 4 from Vogtlandbahn) were refurbished by Czech company CZ Loko, with new seats Borcad REGIO+, a new accessible toilet, air conditioning, WiFi, power outlets for passengers. Since September 2016 are operated on route Karlovy Vary – Mariánské Lázně (4 units) and since December 2017 11 units are operated on Šumava local lines České Budějovice – Černý Kříž, Číčenice – Nové Údolí and Strakonice – Volary. It seems to be the biggest fleet of Regiosprinters at the moment.

One unit was damaged beyond repair after the frontal crash with another train (former DB 628 unit) on May 3, 2018. While the 628 unit was returned to the service, the Regiosprinter was left to be used for spare parts and another unit was from bought from Rurtalbahn, sent for the same upgrade as previous units to refill the fleet.

=== Calgary Transit ===
From April to August 1996 Calgary Transit experimented with a new commuter rail service from Anderson station (Calgary) to a temporary station at 162 Avenue. The RegioSprinters operated on a CP rail line adjacent to the LRT rails today. In 2001, CTrain Red Line extension opened from Anderson station (Calgary) to Somerset-Bridlewood station. Somerset-Bridlewood station is approximately 500 metres south of the original 162 Ave Station.
