= Hvidovre Stadium =

Multi-purpose stadium in Hvidovre, Denmark

Coordinates: 55°37′55″N 12°28′58″E

Hvidovre Stadion Pro Ventilation Arena
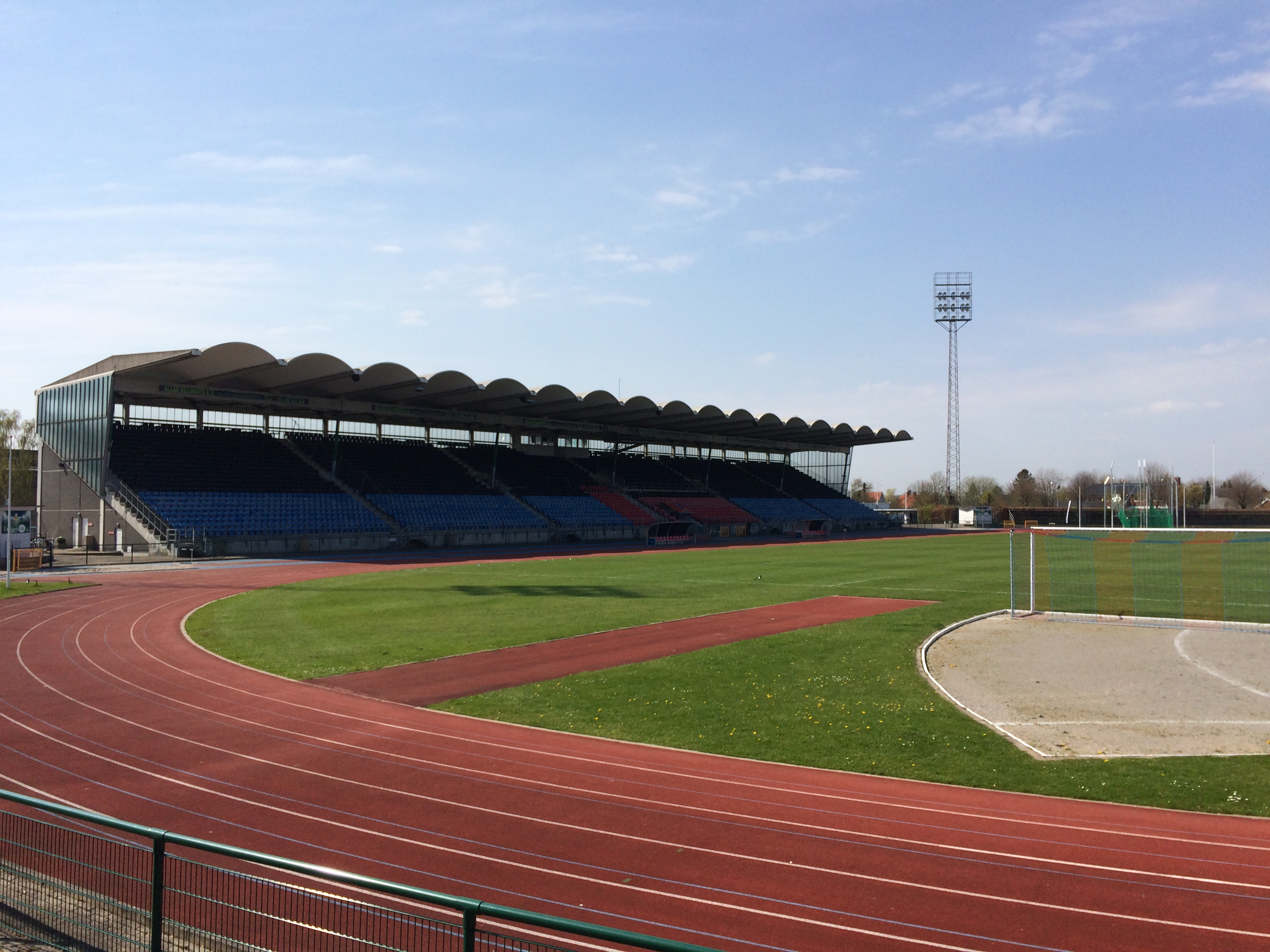
- View for the northeast stand in May 2016
- Interactive map of Hvidovre Stadion; Pro Ventilation Arena
- Former names: Hvidovre Stadion (1935–present); Office Center Arena (2010–2012); Kæmpernes Arena (2012–2019); Pro Ventilation Arena (2019–present)
- Location: Sollentuna Alle/Hvidovrevej 311; 2650 Hvidovre
- Owner: Hvidovre Municipality
- Capacity: 12,000 (4,600 seatings)
- Surface: Natural grass
- Record attendance: 13,400 (Hvidovre IF vs BK Frem, 16 October 1966)
- Field size: 105 x 68 m

Construction
- Groundbreaking: 1932
- Opened: 29 May 1935
- Renovated: 1969–1971, 1976, 1992, 1996, 2003, 2016
- Expanded: 1954
- Cost: DKK 1.85 million (1954); DKK 11 million (1969–1971); DKK 15.5 million (2016)
- Project managers: Højgaard & Schultz (1969–1971)

Tenants
- Hvidovre IF (1938–present); Hvidovre AM (1997–present); Hvidovre Stars (2009–2010)

Hvidovre Stadium (Danish: Hvidovre Stadion) is an athletics- and association football stadium located in Hvidovre, south west of Copenhagen, Denmark, that is owned and operated by Hvidovre Municipality. It is currently used mostly for association football matches and is the home stadium of Hvidovre IF (association football and handball), Hvidovre AM (athletics) and previously Hvidovre Stars (american football). The exhibition field has a lighting installation with a light intensity of 1000 lux, undersoil heating and have been approved for televised matches in the Danish Superliga. The stadium is part of a sports complex, that covers an area of 72,000 m² and also consists of four association football fields, outdoor athletic facilities, a hall for indoor athletics, a hall with two indoor tennis courts, five outdoor tennis courts, a fitness center, a cafeteria including rooms for club members and meetings. Since 1 July 2019, the stadium's main exhibition field has been referred to as Pro Ventilation Arena for sponsorship reasons after having previously been known under the names Office Center Arena (2010–2012) and Kæmpernes Arena (2012–2019). One senior women's national team friendly match have been staged at the arena in 1979, while at least 14 Under-21, Under-19, Under-18, Under-17, Under-16 men's national team matches have been held there between 1964 and 2011.

== History ==
The first couple of football pitches were established in the area in 1932, with the sports complex being officially inaugurated on 29 May 1935. Hvidovre IF started using the stadium for matches in the fall of 1938, which at that time involved two association football fields for training and matches in the north east corner of the current stadium complex. The main entrance and the primary association football pitch were initially located in the far north-east corner next to Høgevej (later renamed Idrætsvej) and there were no parking facilities for automobiles, expect bicycles, within the stadium area. The main association football pitch, referred to as stadionbanen or bane 1, situated next to Hvidovrevej in south end of the complex, was officially established as the stadium's exhibition field in 1954 at a cost of DKK 1 million, which also including building a new club house for Hvidovre IF in the northern section at a cost of DKK 850,000. The construction of the new exhibition field also meant that the main entrance was moved from Idrætsvej to Hvidovrevej 311.

The Nordic Championships in dog racing were held at Hvidovre Stadium on 9 September 1962. On 12 April 1964, in the 2nd Division league match between Hvidovre IF and Frederikshavn fI, the stadium's then record attendance was updated to 5,800 spectators. On 26 April 1964 at 18:00 CET until approx. 19:45 CET, the venue featured the first live television transmission by Danmarks Radio from a domestic competitive league match in the Danmarksturneringen i fodbold, played between the Danish 2nd Division teams Hvidovre IF versus Odense KFUM (in white shirts) and won 2–1 by the Copenhagen suburban-based club. The match was shown in its full length and had over 1 million television viewers nationwide with an attendance of 4,850 at the stadium, where the local club had arranged that the cinder track included nearly 1,000 specially designed seatings (benches) for the spectators.

In the 1970s, 1980s and 1990s the stadium's total published capacity was 15,000 spectators, making it among the largest stadiums in Denmark, but since the early 2000s it was reduced to now hold 12,000 people of which 4,600 are seated at the covered grandstand in the south end—the rest of the stadium being a five row wooden bench type arrangement. The stadium's record attendance was set on 16 October 1966, when 13,400 spectators watched the 1966 Danish 1st Division match between the two highest placed teams in the league and local rivals, Hvidovre IF and BK Frem, in the third last game of the season. With the match ending in a tie, 0–0, Hvidovre IF secured its first Danish Football Championship. As a consequence of Hvidovre IF's championship, Hvidovre Municipality decided to invest DKK 500,000 in a floodlight installment for the stadium, so it was possible to conduct evening football matches in 1967.

In the late 1960s, the local council of the municipality made a decision to construct a grandstand inspired by the newly built grandstand at Valby Idrætspark, with the change of lifting the first row of seats approximately one meter above ground level in order to get a significantly better utilization of the space in front of and under the grandstand. The contractor responsible for the construction of the grandstand with 5,000 seats, Højgaard & Schultz, started work right after the football season ended in the fall of 1969, and the stand officially opened with a ceremony on 24 July 1970 and inaugurated on 24 August 1970 with an association football league match in the 1970 Danish 1st Division between Hvidovre IF and BK Frem. The grandstand features seats in red and blue colours. The whole project cost DKK 10-11 million and also involved decorating the interior of the rooms (for club members, four changing rooms, the board and offices at the ground floor including catering and an exercise room at the first floor) underneath the grandstand, which were ready for occupancy on 1 July 1971. A training hall for athletics was built in 1970 in the east section. The running track got synthetic coating installed in 1976, which was inaugurated with a women's national match, they were renovated in 1992 and again in 2003 efter a 10 years period of extensive wear and tear.

Leading up to Hvidovre IF's tenure in the 1996–97 Danish Superliga, renovations had to be made in order for the arena to meet the then requirements expected to participate at the Danish top football level—any participation in a European Tournament would require additional investments. During 6 to 7 weeks in the summer of 1996, the stadium was provided with better facilities for camera crews including building a new tv-platform, the toilet conditions were improved, and some more barriers were erected at the stands by Hvidovre Municipality at a total cost of DKK 3 million.

As part of the 75 years anniversary celebrations for the foundation of Hvidovre IF, the local museum for the suburb, Forstadsmuseet, installed four neon signages above the main entrance on the grandstand facade, referred to as Wall of Sportsevents, featuring the years for each of the club's three league championships and one cup victory. As a piece of concept art, a 6 x 8 m neon signage, referred as Hvidovre Lys-Tårn (English: Hvidovre Light Tower), was installed 15 meters above the ground on one of the floodlights next to the exhibition pitch facing Hvidovrevej. The signage consists vertical neon tubes in the red and blue colors of Hvidovre IF, while green symbolise the empty football field during the 15 minutes break in between the first and second halves, and programmed to turn on and off at fixed times in the morning and evening to form a slow-changing image, meant to symbolise the phases of an association football match. Both light displays were designed by one of Denmark's then leading light artists, Thorbjørn Lausten.

In 2014, the existing floodlights with a light intensity of 400 lux were upgraded to 1000 lux to meet the requirements for showing televised evening matches in the Danish Superliga. During three months in the summer of 2016, the running tracks surrounding the exhibition field were expanded and upgraded from the existing six lanes to eight lanes, the existing red colored tracks were renovated and replaced with blue coating, the sewer in front of the grandstand was renovated, a new roof for the clubhouse, while undersoil heating was installed on both the main football pitch and lane 1 inside the stadium. Besides a new heating system, new sinks, a new irrigation system and new rolled natural grass turf, the size of the exhibition pitch was upgraded from the existing 102 x 65 meters to 105 x 68 meters to accommodate the Danish FA's requirements for football stadiums in the top three tiers in Denmark, especially tier two. By expanding to eight lanes, the stadium and the local athletics club, Hvidovre AM, could be considered as hosts for larger national and international sports events in the future, such as the Danish Championships. The renovations in 2016 cost the Hvidovre Municipality a total of DKK 15.5 million. Due to the renovations, two of Hvidovre IF competitive matches in the 2016–17 season of the Danish 2nd Divisions were played at Avedøre Stadium.

== Name, sponsorships and logos ==
In August 2010, Hvidovre Stadium changed its name to Office Center Arena, when an Avedøre Holme-based distributor of print and office machines, Office Center A/S (formerly known as Copy Data), bought the name for two years, following a permission given to Hvidovre Fodbold A/S the previous year from the Council of Hvidovre Municipality as an extension to the club's rental agreement of the stadium. When the sponsorship agreement expired in September 2012, Hvidovre IF's supporter club, HIF's Gamle Kæmper, bought the naming rights to the stadium in late October 2012, renaming it Kæmpernes Arena, for the next couple of seasons. A technical, engineering and contractor house, based in Rødovre, acquired the stadium's name in late June 2019 in a three years sponsorship agreement, renaming it Pro Ventilation Arena effective from 1 July 2019.

Logos used for the naming rights agreements of the stadium:

Office Center Arena
(2010–2012)
Sponsor: Office Center A/S

Kæmpernes Arena
(2012–2019)
Sponsor: HIF's Gamle Kæmper

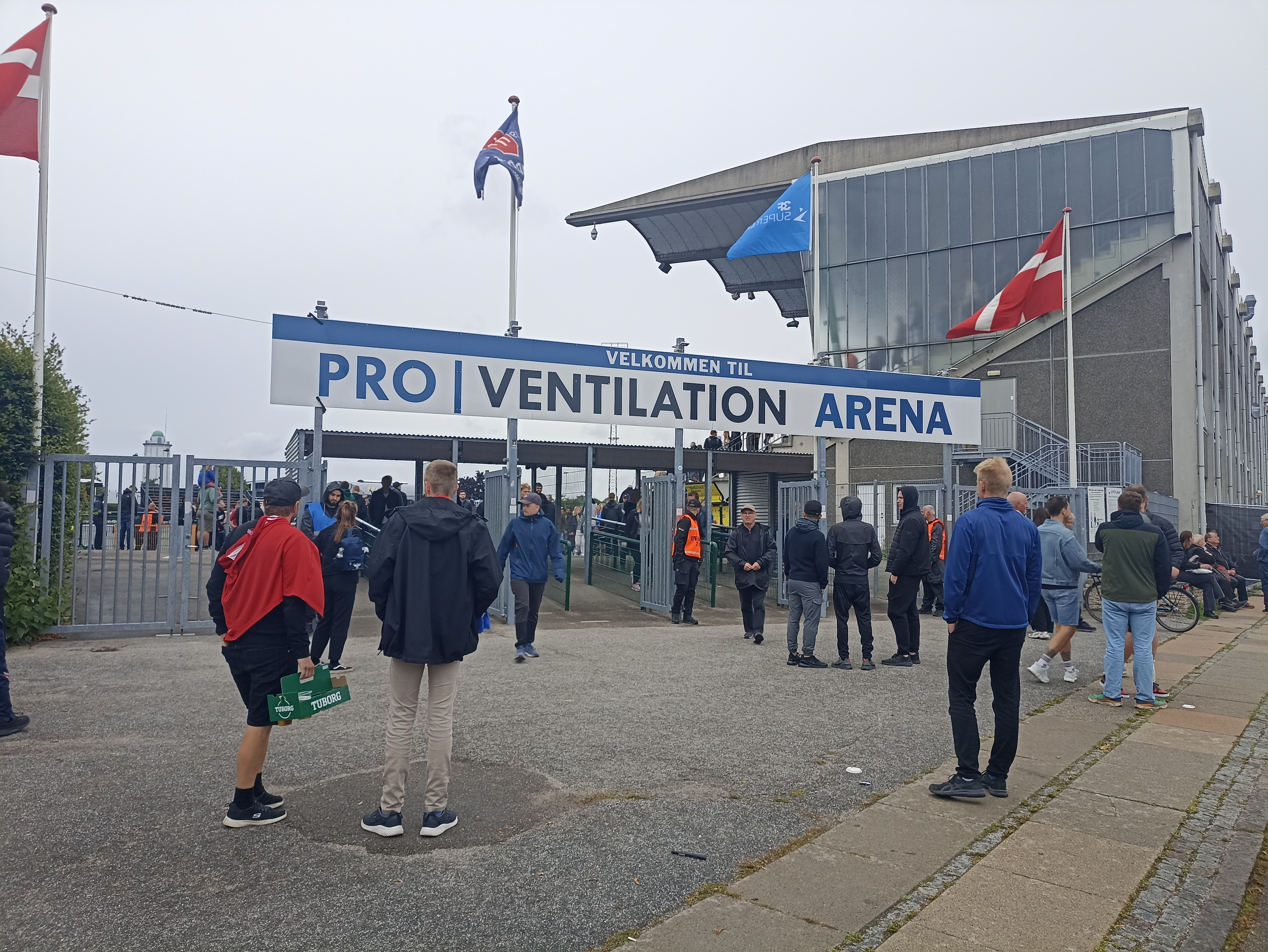
Pro Ventilation Arena
(2019–present)
Sponsor: Pro Ventilation A/S
