= 2025 Hvidovre municipal election =

Municipal election in Denmark

← 2021	18 November 2025	2029 →

All 21 seats to the Hvidovre municipal council 11 seats needed for a majority
- Turnout: 26,560 (64.3%) ▲3.5%
	First party	Second party	Third party
	F	A	C
Party	Green Left	Social Democrats	Conservatives
Last election	4 seats, 15.5%	7 seats, 34.9%	4 seats, 16.4%
Seats won	6	5	3
Seat change	▲2	▼2	▼1
Popular vote	6,914	6,296	2,717
Percentage	26.5%	24.1%	10.4%
Swing	▲11.0%	▼10.7%	▼6.0%
	Fourth party	Fifth party	Sixth party
	O	L	Ø
Party	Danish People's Party	Hvidovrelisten	Red-Green Alliance
Last election	1 seat, 5.9%	2 seats, 6.9%	1 seat, 5.4%
Seats won	2	2	1
Seat change	▲1	0	0
Popular vote	2,684	1,972	1,803
Percentage	10.3%	7.6%	6.9%
Swing	▲4.4%	▲0.7%	▲1.6%
	Seventh party	Eighth party	Ninth party
	I	B	V
Party	Liberal Alliance	Social Liberals	Venstre
Last election	0 seats, 0.9%	0 seats, 3.0%	1 seat, 6.0%
Seats won	1	1	0
Seat change	▲1	▲1	▼1
Popular vote	1,140	949	763
Percentage	4.4%	3.6%	2.9%
Swing	▲3.5%	▲0.7%	▼3.1%
Mayor before election
Anders Wolf Andresen
Green Left
Mayor after election
Anders Wolf Andresen
Green Left

The 2025 Hvidovre Municipal election was held on November 18, 2025, to elect the 21 members to sit in the regional council for the Hvidovre Municipal council, in the period of 2026 to 2029. Anders Wolf Andresen from the Green Left, would secure re-election.

== Background ==
Following the 2021 election, Anders Wolf Andresen from Green Left became mayor for his first term. He would run for re-election.

== Electoral system ==
For elections to Danish municipalities, a number varying from 9 to 31 are chosen to be elected to the municipal council. The seats are then allocated using the D'Hondt method and a closed list proportional representation. Hvidovre Municipality had 21 seats in 2025.

== Electoral alliances ==
=== Electoral Alliance 1 ===
Party		Political alignment
B	Social Liberals	Centre to Centre-left
L	Hvidovrelisten	Local politics
M	Moderates	Centre to Centre-right

=== Electoral Alliance 2 ===
Party		Political alignment
C	Conservatives	Centre-right
I	Liberal Alliance	Centre-right to Right-wing
O	Danish People's Party	Right-wing to Far-right
V	Venstre	Centre-right
Æ	Denmark Democrats	Right-wing to Far-right

=== Electoral Alliance 3 ===
Party		Political alignment
F	Green Left	Centre-left to Left-wing
Ø	Red-Green Alliance	Left-wing to Far-Left

== Results by polling station ==
Division	A	B	C	F	I	L	M	O	V	Æ	Ø
Division	%	%	%	%	%	%	%	%	%	%	%
Holmegårdshallen	17.6	3.7	10.6	30.6	6.0	7.6	1.7	8.8	3.0	1.6	8.6
Præstemoseskolen	24.3	3.2	9.5	25.3	4.8	9.9	1.4	11.3	2.1	1.5	6.7
Sønderkærskolen	21.9	3.7	9.1	25.8	4.5	7.1	1.9	12.1	2.8	2.0	9.0
Kometen	23.4	3.1	9.9	29.8	4.2	6.6	1.9	10.4	2.5	2.4	5.8
Dansborghallen	20.8	4.4	12.3	29.0	4.9	7.8	1.4	8.3	4.1	1.4	5.6
Frihedens Idrætscenter	24.6	3.6	10.3	28.5	3.9	6.8	1.6	10.7	2.9	1.2	6.0
Avedøre Skole	27.0	3.6	12.5	21.8	3.8	8.7	1.6	10.6	3.3	1.7	5.4
Avedøre Idrætscenter	33.6	3.6	7.6	20.7	3.1	6.4	1.0	11.0	2.0	1.6	9.3

== Results ==
Party		Votes	%	+/-	Seats	+/-
Hvidovre Municipality
F	Green Left	6,914	26.51	+10.99	6	+2
A	Social Democrats	6,296	24.14	-10.73	5	-2
C	Conservatives	2,717	10.42	-5.96	3	-1
O	Danish People's Party	2,684	10.29	+4.37	2	+1
L	Hvidovrelisten	1,972	7.56	+0.68	2	0
Ø	Red-Green Alliance	1,803	6.91	+1.56	1	0
I	Liberal Alliance	1,140	4.37	+3.45	1	+1
B	Social Liberals	949	3.64	+0.68	1	+1
V	Venstre	763	2.93	-3.09	0	-1
Æ	Denmark Democrats	431	1.65	New	0	New
M	Moderates	412	1.58	New	0	New
Total		26,081	100	N/A	21	N/A
Invalid votes		76	0.18	+0.03		
Blank votes		403	0.98	+0.09		
Turnout		26,560	64.31	+3.52		
Source: valg.dk

== Opinion polls ==
Polling firm	Fieldwork date	Sample size	A	C	F	L	V	O	Ø	B	I	M	Æ	Others	Lead
Epinion	4 Sep - 13 Oct 2025	505	28.7	6.0	29.1	–	5.0	9.1	7.7	2.6	5.4	1.6	3.3	1.5	0.4
2024 european parliament election	9 Jun 2024		19.0	8.6	21.7	–	8.4	8.4	9.0	7.0	5.4	5.9	3.8	–	2.7
2022 general election	1 Nov 2022		32.3	4.6	11.4	–	8.1	4.7	5.5	4.3	6.1	9.7	4.6	–	20.9
2021 regional election	16 Nov 2021		32.9	16.7	13.6	–	7.1	6.2	6.9	5.5	1.2	–	–	–	16.2
2021 municipal election	16 Nov 2021		34.9 (7)	16.4 (4)	15.5 (4)	6.9 (2)	6.0 (1)	5.9 (1)	5.4 (1)	3.0 (0)	0.9 (0)	–	–	–	18.5
