= Listed buildings in Hvidovre Municipality =

This is a list of listed buildings in Hvidovre Municipality, Denmark.

== The list ==
Listing name	Image	Location	Coordinates	Description
Avedøre Airfield		Gammel Køge Landevej 580, 2660 Brøndby Strand	55°37′2.87″N 12°26′28.99″E	Hangar from 1918
Avedøre Airfield		Gammel Køge Landevej 580, 2660 Brøndby Strand	55°37′2.87″N 12°26′28.99″E	Hangar from 1918
Hvidovre Rytterskole		Hvidovre Kirkeplads 1, 2650 Hvidovre	55°39′24.09″N 12°28′21.89″E	A Rytterskole from 1723
