= Vilhelm Lauritzen's Terminal =

Listed building in Denmark

Vilhelm Lauritzen'sTerminal
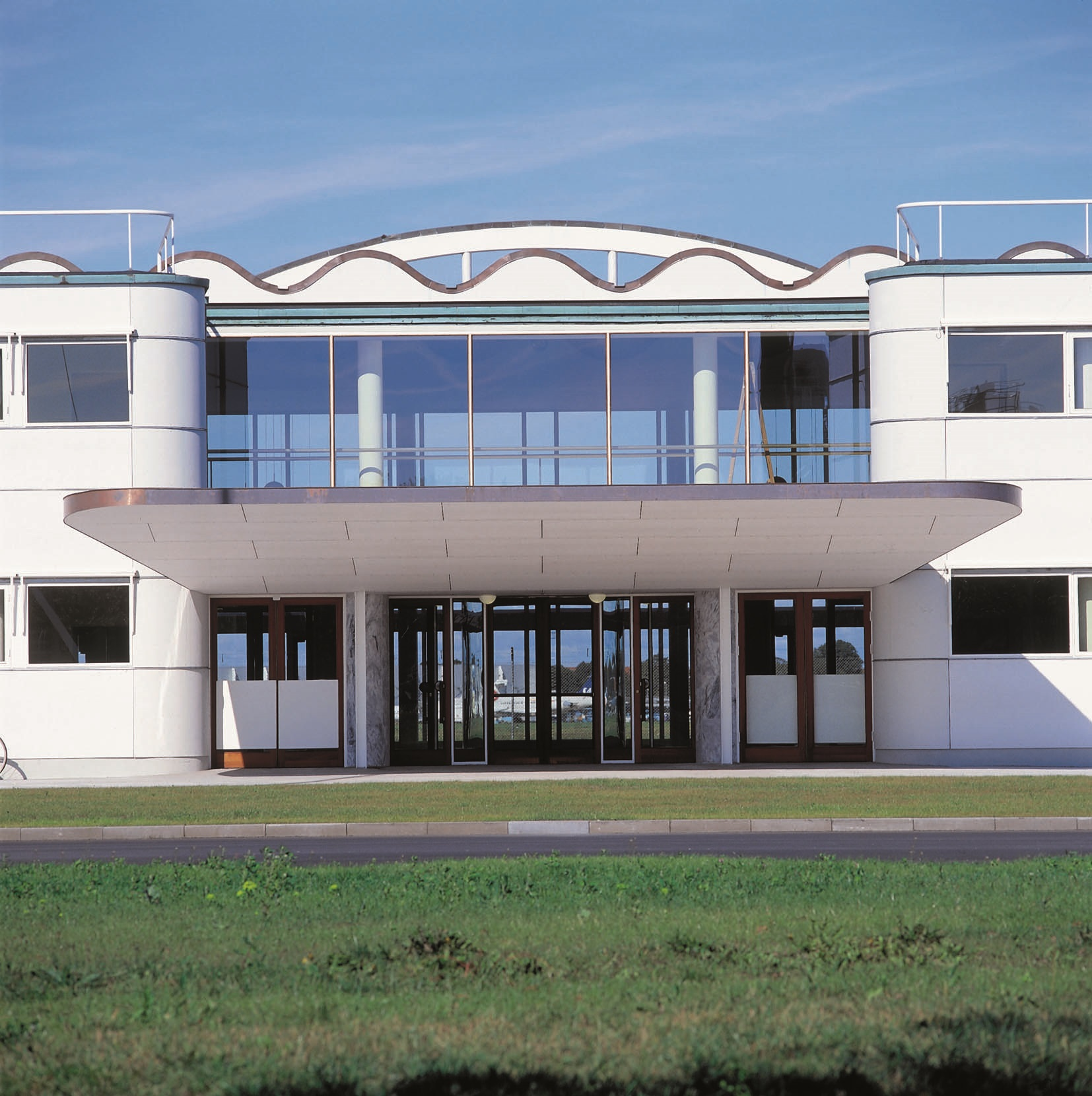
- Interactive map of the Vilhelm Lauritzen'sTerminal area

General information
- Location: Kastrup, Copenhagen, Denmark
- Coordinates: 55°37′43.68″N 12°39′15.48″E
- Completed: 1939
- Renovated: 1999

Vilhelm Lauritzen's Terminal, constructed in 1939 to a Functionalist design by Vilhelm Lauritzen, was the first airport terminal constructed at Copenhagen Airport. The building is internationally recognised as a principal example of Danish modernist architecture. It was moved to its current location in 1999. It was listed on the Danish registry of protected buildings and places in 2000. It is now used for receiving foreign heads of state and other VIPs arriving at the airport.

== History ==
Copenhagen's first airfield was located at Kløvermarken. The new Copenhagen Airport began operations on a grass field a little further to the south in 1925. In the late 1930s, Vilhelm Lauritzen was charged with designing the airport's first terminal. The building was completed in 1939.

In the 1990s, it was decided to move the terminal building to make way for a planned expansion of the airport. In September 1999, it was moved on coupled flatbed trucks across the apron and the runways to its new location.

The building was listed on the Danish registry of protected buildings and places in 2000.

== Awards ==
- Diploma for Hovedstadens forskønnelse (2001)
- MIPIM Award for Best Refurbished Office Buildings (2002)
- Europe Nostra Honorary Medal for preservation of European cultural heritage (2003)

== See also ==
- Danish Modern
- Avedøre Airfield
- Hangar H
- Hotel Astoria (Copenhagen)
