= 2017 Albertslund Municipal election =

Election in Albertslund, Denmark

- November 21, 2017

All 21 seats in the Albertslund Municipal Council 11 seats needed for a majority
- Turnout: 13,884 (66.1%) ▼0.8%
| | First party | Second party | Third party |
|---|---|---|---|
| | A | O | Ø |
| Party | Social Democrats | Danish People's Party | Red–Green Alliance |
| Last election | 9 seats, 39.7% | 3 seats, 13.7% | 3 seats, 15.0% |
| Seats won | 9 | 3 | 2 |
| Seat change | 0 | 0 | ▼1 |
| Popular vote | 5,819 | 1,805 | 1,588 |
| Percentage | 41.9% | 13.0% | 11.4% |
| Swing | ▲2.2% | ▼0.7% | ▼3.6% |
| | Fourth party | Fifth party | Sixth party |
| | F | C | V |
| Party | Green Left | Conservatives | Venstre |
| Last election | 2 seats, 8.6% | 1 seat, 7.2% | 2 seats, 8.6% |
| Seats won | 2 | 2 | 1 |
| Seat change | 0 | ▲1 | ▼1 |
| Popular vote | 1,213 | 964 | 842 |
| Percentage | 8.7% | 6.9% | 6.1% |
| Swing | ▲0.1% | ▼0.2% | ▼2.5% |
| | Seventh party | Eighth party |
| | Å | B |
| Party | The Alternative | Social Liberals |
| Last election | New | 1 seat, 4.0% |
| Seats won | 1 | 1 |
| Seat change | New | 0 |
| Popular vote | 636 | 628 |
| Percentage | 4.6% | 4.5% |
| Swing | New | ▲0.5% |
Mayor before election
Steen Christiansen
Social Democrats
Elected Mayor
Steen Christiansen
Social Democrats

The 2017 Albertslund Municipal election was held on 21 November 2017, to elect the 21 members to sit in the regional council for the Albertslund Municipality in the period of 2018 to 2021. Mayor Steen Christiansen won a third term.

== Result ==
| Party | | Votes | % | +/- | Seats | +/- |
Albertslund Municipality
| A | Social Democrats | 5,819 | 41.91 | +2.38 | 9 | 0 |
| O | Danish People's Party | 1,805 | 13.00 | -0.16 | 3 | 0 |
| Ø | Red–Green Alliance | 1,588 | 11.44 | -3.60 | 2 | -1 |
| F | Green Left | 1,213 | 8.74 | +0.10 | 2 | 0 |
| C | Conservatives | 964 | 6.94 | -0.24 | 2 | +1 |
| V | Venstre | 842 | 6.06 | -2.53 | 1 | -1 |
| Å | The Alternative | 636 | 4.58 | New | 1 | New |
| B | Social Liberals | 628 | 4.52 | +0.48 | 1 | 0 |
| I | Liberal Alliance | 260 | 1.87 | -0.62 | 0 | 0 |
| N | National Party | 56 | 0.40 | New | 0 | New |
| Æ | Albertslund Lokalliste | 50 | 0.36 | New | 0 | New |
| P | Stram Kurs | 23 | 0.17 | New | 0 | New |
| Total | | 13,884 | 100 | N/A | 21 | N/A |
| Invalid votes | | 75 | 0.35 | +0.01 | | |
| Blank votes | | 154 | 0.72 | -0.33 | | |
| Turnout | | 14,113 | 66.07 | | | |
Source: valg.dk
