= National Party (Denmark) =

National Party Nationalpartiet
- Leader: Asif Ahmad, Kashif Ahmad, Aamer Ahmad
- Founded: 16 October 2014
- Headquarters: Hvidovre
- Ideology: Centrism
- Folketing: 0 / 179
- Municipal councils: 0 / 2,432

Election symbol
- N

Website
- Nationalpartiet.dk

The National Party (Danish: Nationalpartiet) is a center-left political party in Denmark. It was formed in 2014 by three Danish-Pakistani brothers in opposition to the right wing parties in Denmark.

== History ==
The party was founded in 2014 by Kashif Ahmad, Aamer Ahmad, and Asif Ahmad. Kashif Ahmad was a member of the municipal council in Hvidovre Municipality when the party was founded, thus giving the party a seat.

It did not manage to run for the 2015 election. However, several of the individual members ran as independents, including Yahya Hassan.

In April 2016, the party claimed to have gathered enough signatures to run for the next general election. However, a new digital system of gathering signatures had been implemented by the Ministry of the Interior and of Social Affairs, and problems with this system made many of the National Party's signatures ineligible.

In January 2019, party leader Kashif Ahmad left the party in favour of Alternativet. He was succeeded as party leader by his brother Asif.
