= 1973 Danish 1st Division =

28th season of Danish 1st Division

Danish 1st Division
- Season: 1973

Statistics of Danish 1st Division in the 1973 season.

== Overview ==
It was contested by 12 teams, and Hvidovre IF won the championship.

== League standings ==
Pos	Team	Pld	W	D	L	GF	GA	GD	Pts
1	Hvidovre IF	22	10	7	5	52	33	+19	27
2	Randers Sportsklub Freja	22	10	6	6	35	26	+9	26
3	Kjøbenhavns Boldklub	22	10	6	6	43	43	0	26
4	Vejle Boldklub	22	10	3	9	40	31	+9	23
5	Køge BK	22	10	3	9	29	28	+1	23
6	Aalborg Boldspilklub	22	6	9	7	32	30	+2	21
7	B 1901	22	8	5	9	45	54	−9	21
8	Næstved IF	22	8	5	9	36	40	−4	21
9	Boldklubben 1903	22	6	8	8	25	28	−3	20
10	Boldklubben Frem	22	6	8	8	38	45	−7	20
11	Akademisk Boldklub	22	7	5	10	34	40	−6	19
12	Aarhus Gymnastikforening	22	5	7	10	25	36	−11	17

== Results ==
Home \ Away	ABK	AaB	AGF	B01	B03	BKF	HIF	KB	KBK	NIF	RSF	VBK
Akademisk BK	—	2–2	2–4	1–1	0–0	3–4	0–5	0–2	3–1	4–3	1–0	4–1
Aalborg BK	0–3	—	1–1	3–3	0–1	1–1	1–1	3–2	3–0	2–0	0–1	1–0
Aarhus GF	3–0	1–5	—	3–1	1–1	1–2	0–3	1–1	0–2	0–1	1–1	0–2
B 1901	2–1	1–3	1–1	—	3–1	2–2	1–3	1–3	1–0	4–3	2–1	5–5
B 1903	2–1	2–2	1–0	1–2	—	2–0	2–2	1–2	0–2	2–2	1–1	3–2
BK Frem	2–1	1–1	5–2	1–4	0–1	—	3–7	2–2	2–2	2–2	5–1	0–2
Hvidovre IF	2–2	1–1	0–0	5–2	1–1	2–2	—	2–4	4–0	2–0	4–0	3–2
Kjøbenhavns BK	0–3	3–2	0–0	5–3	1–0	1–2	4–3	—	1–2	3–2	0–3	2–1
Køge BK	1–1	1–0	4–1	1–2	2–1	1–0	0–1	6–1	—	0–1	1–0	1–0
Næstved IF	2–0	1–0	1–3	6–2	1–0	2–2	3–0	2–2	1–0	—	1–3	0–4
Randers Freja	2–0	1–1	1–0	3–1	2–2	3–0	1–0	3–3	1–1	4–1	—	3–0
Vejle BK	1–2	3–0	1–2	2–1	1–0	2–0	4–1	1–1	4–1	1–1	1–0	—

Legend: Blue = home team win; Yellow = draw; Red = away team win.
