= Kystagerparken =

Park in Hvidovre, Denmark

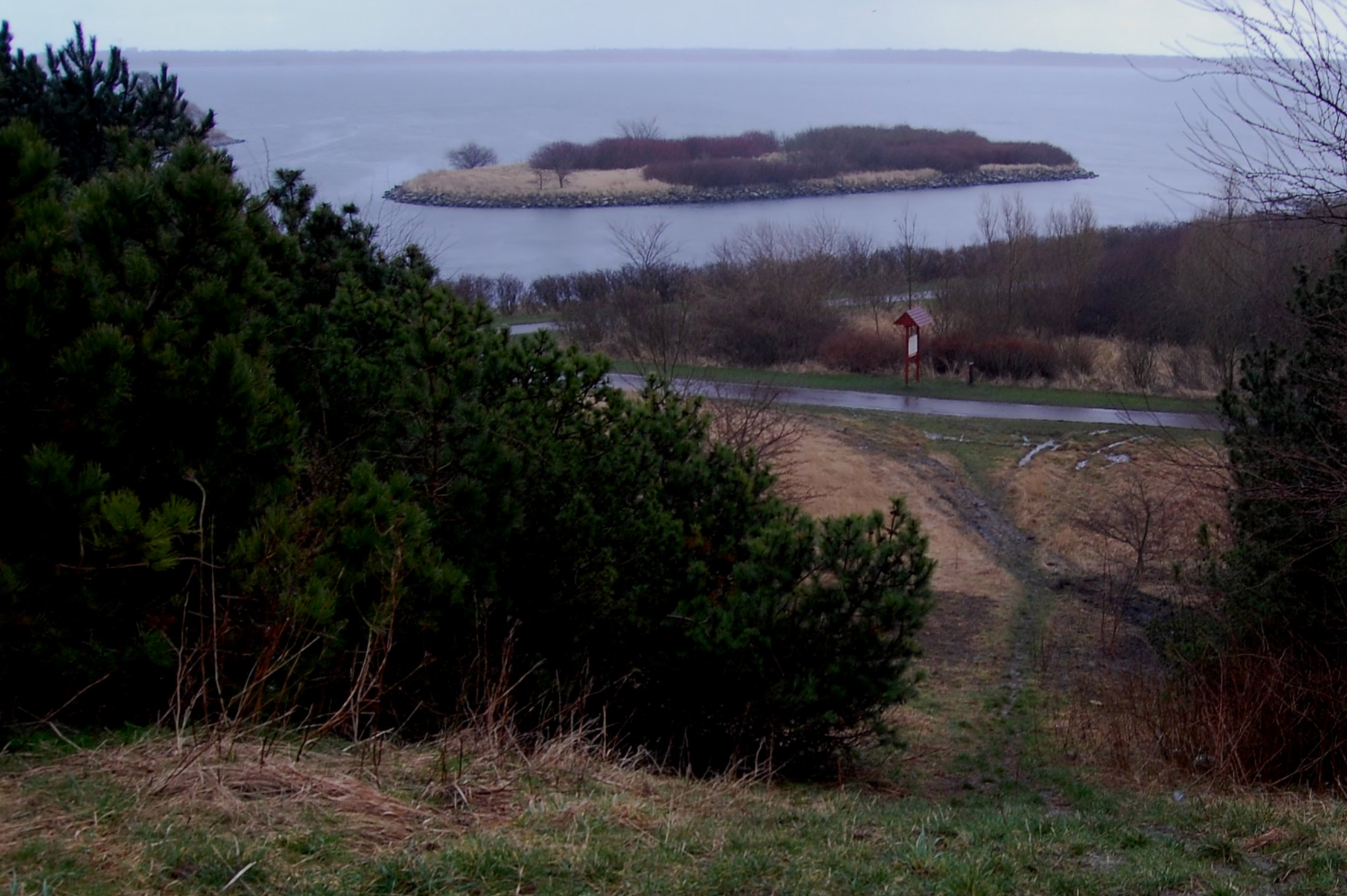
- View from the top of the hill 'Bjerget', overlooking the isle of Fugleø at the fairway of Kalveboderne.
- Interactive map of Kystagerparken
- Type: Urban park
- Location: Hvidovre, Denmark
- Coordinates: 55.633°N 12.503°E
- Area: 81.5 acres (33.0 ha)
- Created: 1957
- Status: Open all year

Kystagerparken is a park located in Hvidovre, Denmark, it borders Kalveboderne, the waters between Zealand and Amager. The nearest railway station is Åmarken.

Kystagerparken is just one of several connected parks and green spaces in and around Hvidovre and link to areas such as Strandengen, Mågeparken, Vestvolden, Rebæk Søpark, Valbyparken and Vigerslevparken to name some.

== History ==
The artificial hill of 'Bjerget' (English: The Mountain) in the park, was constructed from excess dirt from the excavations at Kongens Bryghus in Frederiksberg in 1957. Kystagerparken has a status as a wildlife reserve and became an EU protected bird sanctuary in 1994. The grass is allowed to grow freely and the many wild flowers, seeds and plants provides habitat for insects, shrew, skylark, foxes and the common kestrel.

== Activities in the park ==
Kystagerparken invites to a number of activities throughout the year:

A Solar System model on a scale of 1:1,000,000,000 stretches through the park to Mågeparken, another park nearby. The planet path reaches from the Sun on the hill of 'Bjerget', to the outermost planet Pluto 5.9 km away. In 2000, when the planet path was constructed as a public elementary school project, Pluto was still considered a planet. Each planet is cast in bronze and placed in the correct distance relative to each other.

In autumn, when stronger winds blow across the country, the hill of 'Bjerget' is considered an excellent place for flying kites. During snowfall in winter, it facilitates activities like sledding and on Easter Day in the spring, the Cultural Council of Hvidovre arrange "egg rolling" for kids here; an old Danish Easter tradition.

== Sources ==
- Kystagerparken and Bjerget Hvidovre Municipality (in Danish)
- Planetstien Hvidovre Municipality (in Danish)
