= 2021 Hvidovre municipal election =

- 16 November 2021

All 21 seats to the Hvidovre Municipal Council 11 seats needed for a majority
- Turnout: 24,912 (60.8%) ▼5.1pp
	First party	Second party	Third party
	A	C	F
Party	Social Democrats	Conservatives	Green Left
Last election	8 seats, 33,8%	2 seats, 7.8%	3 seats, 10.6%
Seats won	7	4	4
Seat change	▼1	▲2	▲1
Popular vote	8,535	4,010	3,800
Percentage	34.9%	16.4%	15.5%
Swing	▲1.1%	▲8.6%	▲4.9%
	Fourth party	Fifth party	Sixth party
	H	V	O
Party	Hvidovrelisten	Venstre	Danish People's Party
Last election	2 seats, 9.8%	2 seats, 8.1%	3 seats, 13.8%
Seats won	2	1	1
Seat change	0	▼1	▼2
Popular vote	1,685	1,472	1,450
Percentage	6.9%	6.0%	5.9%
Swing	▼2.9%	▼2.1%	▼7.9%
	Seventh party	Eighth party
	Ø	D
Party	Red–Green Alliance	New Right
Last election	1 seat, 5.9%	0 seats, 1.3%
Seats won	1	1
Seat change	0	▲1
Popular vote	1,310	866
Percentage	5.4%	3.5%
Swing	▼0.5%	▲2.2%
Mayor before election
Helle Moesgaard Adelborg
Social Democrats
Mayor after election
Anders Wolf Andresen
Green Left

Ever since 1944, the Social Democrats had held the mayor's position in Hvidovre Municipality.

In the 2017 election, the Social Democrats had won 8 seats and become the largest party. Helle Moesgaard Adelborg would eventually become mayor for her 2nd full term (Note: she also took over in 2012 from Milton Graff Pedersen).

In this election, once again it would be the Social Democrats who won the most seats, despite losing a seat. However, the Conservatives, the Green Left, Venstre, the Red–Green Alliance and local party Hvidovrelisten reached an agreement without the Social Democrats. This would see Anders Wolf Andresen from the Green Left secure the mayor's position.

This was 1 of only 2 municipalities in the 2017 elections where the Green Left would win the mayor's position.

== Electoral system ==
For elections to Danish municipalities, a number varying from 9 to 31 are chosen to be elected to the municipal council. The seats are then allocated using the D'Hondt method and a closed list proportional representation. Hvidovre Municipality had 21 seats in 2021

Unlike in Danish General Elections, in elections to municipal councils, electoral alliances are allowed.

== Electoral alliances ==
=== Electoral Alliance 1 ===
Party		Political alignment
C	Conservatives	Centre-right
O	Danish People's Party	Right-wing to Far-right
V	Venstre	Centre-right

=== Electoral Alliance 2 ===
Party		Political alignment
B	Social Liberals	Centre to Centre-left
F	Green Left	Centre-left to Left-wing
G	Vegan Party	Single-issue
H	Hvidovrelisten	Local politics
Ø	Red–Green Alliance	Left-wing to Far-Left

=== Electoral Alliance 3 ===
Party		Political alignment
D	New Right	Right-wing to Far-right
I	Liberal Alliance	Centre-right to Right-wing
L	Lokalisten 2650	Local politics

== Results by polling station ==
L = Lokallisten 2650
R = Kommunistisk Liste

Division	A	B	C	D	F	G	H	I	L	O	R	V	Ø
Division	%	%	%	%	%	%	%	%	%	%	%	%	%
Holmegårdshallen	25.7	4.5	18.4	3.2	17.8	0.4	8.9	1.2	1.2	5.8	0.3	5.9	6.6
Præstemoseskolen	32.4	2.5	18.5	4.4	15.2	0.2	7.8	0.8	0.6	6.1	0.3	6.3	4.9
Sønderkærskolen	36.7	3.3	14.3	4.2	15.4	0.4	5.4	1.0	0.8	5.8	0.2	6.0	6.6
Kometen	34.0	2.9	14.5	3.1	18.9	0.3	7.5	1.1	0.8	6.1	0.0	5.6	5.2
Avedøre Idrætscenter	44.5	2.7	12.0	3.8	12.6	0.4	3.6	0.7	2.6	5.9	0.4	3.9	6.9
Avedøre Skole	37.7	2.6	17.9	4.1	11.0	0.1	8.1	0.8	1.1	6.4	0.1	6.4	3.8
Frihedens Idrætscenter	36.6	2.3	16.4	3.2	16.9	0.3	6.5	0.7	1.0	5.5	0.2	6.0	4.5
Dansborghallen	30.7	3.1	18.6	2.6	16.8	0.3	7.0	1.1	0.9	6.0	0.2	7.7	5.1

== Results ==
Party		Votes	%	+/-	Seats	+/-
Hvidovre Municipality
A	Social Democrats	8,535	34.87	+1.05	7	-1
C	Conservatives	4,010	16.38	+8.54	4	+2
F	Green Left	3,800	15.52	+4.97	4	+1
H	Hvidovrelisten	1,685	6.88	-2.91	2	0
V	Venstre	1,472	6.01	-2.12	1	-1
O	Danish People's Party	1,450	5.92	-7.88	1	-2
Ø	Red-Green Alliance	1,310	5.35	-0.55	1	0
D	New Right	866	3.54	+2.27	1	+1
B	Social Liberals	725	2.96	+0.84	0	0
L	Lokallisten 2650	279	1.14	New	0	New
I	Liberal Alliance	225	0.92	-0.13	0	0
G	Vegan Party	73	0.30	New	0	New
R	Kommunistisk Liste	49	0.20	New	0	New
Total		24,479	100	N/A	21	N/A
Invalid votes		65	0.16	+0.06		
Blank votes		368	0.90	-0.01		
Turnout		24,912	60.79	-5.10		
Source: valg.dk
