= 1981 Danish 1st Division =

36th season of Danish 1st Division

Danish 1st Division
- Season: 1981

The 1981 Danish 1st Division season was the 36th season of the Danish 1st Division league championship, governed by the Danish Football Association. It constituted the 68th edition of the Danish football championship, and saw Hvidovre IF win their third championship title.

The Danish champions qualified for the European Cup 1982-83, while the second placed teams qualified for the UEFA Cup 1982-83. The three lowest placed teams of the tournament were directly relegated to the Danish 2nd Division for the following season. Likewise, the Danish 2nd Division champions and two first runners-up were promoted to the 1st Division.

== Table ==
Pos	Team	Pld	W	D	L	GF	GA	GD	Pts
1	Hvidovre IF	30	15	10	5	42	25	+17	40
2	Lyngby BK	30	16	7	7	54	34	+20	39
3	Næstved IF	30	13	12	5	51	36	+15	38
4	Aarhus GF	30	14	10	6	47	33	+14	38
5	Esbjerg fB	30	13	10	7	46	38	+8	36
6	Odense BK	30	13	8	9	53	40	+13	34
7	KB	30	13	6	11	62	58	+4	32
8	B 1901	30	13	6	11	51	50	+1	32
9	Vejle BK	30	7	15	8	51	48	+3	29
10	Køge BK	30	9	11	10	38	45	−7	29
11	B 93	30	9	10	11	39	48	−9	28
12	Ikast FS	30	10	6	14	46	49	−3	26
13	B 1903	30	5	13	12	28	39	−11	23
14	Kastrup BK	30	6	11	13	30	42	−12	23
15	Herfølge BK	30	6	6	18	33	57	−24	18
16	Viborg FF	30	5	5	20	33	62	−29	15

== Results ==
Home \ Away	AGF	B93	B01	B03	EfB	HBK	HIF	IFS	KAS	KB	KBK	LBK	NIF	OB	VBK	VFF
Aarhus GF	—	2–2	2–1	2–1	1–1	1–1	2–0	3–0	2–2	1–0	3–2	3–2	1–2	2–0	0–0	4–0
B.93	2–2	—	1–0	1–0	3–4	3–1	0–2	2–1	1–1	2–4	1–2	2–1	0–0	0–2	0–3	3–2
B 1901	2–1	1–1	—	1–0	3–0	4–0	2–0	2–7	1–1	6–1	0–2	2–0	2–2	1–4	1–4	1–0
B 1903	2–2	1–1	0–0	—	0–0	1–0	0–0	2–1	1–1	5–2	1–3	1–1	2–2	2–0	0–0	1–0
Esbjerg fB	0–0	5–1	4–4	3–0	—	4–0	2–1	0–1	1–1	2–1	4–2	0–3	0–0	2–1	0–0	2–1
Herfølge BK	3–0	0–2	0–1	0–0	0–1	—	1–1	1–4	3–0	0–1	1–1	0–0	0–5	1–4	0–0	1–3
Hvidovre IF	2–1	1–0	2–3	1–0	0–0	2–1	—	1–0	2–0	0–0	1–1	2–1	1–0	3–1	1–1	3–0
Ikast FS	2–0	1–1	0–0	2–0	0–1	5–4	0–1	—	2–1	1–2	4–0	0–2	0–1	0–0	1–1	1–0
Kastrup BK	1–4	0–2	4–1	1–0	2–3	1–2	1–1	2–0	—	1–0	1–0	1–2	1–1	1–2	1–1	1–2
Kjøbenhavns BK	1–2	1–1	1–2	4–2	0–3	2–1	1–1	4–3	1–1	—	2–0	3–5	4–4	3–2	3–2	6–2
Køge BK	0–0	1–1	2–4	1–0	2–1	0–2	2–2	4–2	1–0	0–3	—	1–1	1–1	1–0	1–1	3–1
Lyngby BK	0–0	3–0	2–0	3–2	3–1	3–1	1–0	3–3	3–1	3–1	1–1	—	1–0	1–2	3–1	2–1
Næstved IF	0–2	2–0	2–1	1–1	2–0	3–1	1–1	5–1	0–0	0–4	2–0	2–1	—	1–1	1–3	2–1
Odense BK	4–2	1–1	3–1	3–0	1–1	2–1	0–1	3–0	3–1	3–2	2–2	1–1	1–3	—	1–1	2–2
Vejle BK	0–1	3–2	3–1	2–2	5–1	3–6	1–4	3–3	0–1	2–2	1–1	0–1	3–3	1–3	—	3–1
Viborg FF	0–1	1–3	1–3	1–1	0–0	0–1	2–5	0–1	0–0	1–3	2–1	2–1	2–3	2–1	3–3	—

Legend: Blue = home team win; Yellow = draw; Red = away team win.

== Top goalscorers ==
Position	Player	Club	Goals
1	Allan Hansen	Odense BK	28
2	Gert Jørgensen	B 1901	22
3	Flemming Christensen	Lyngby BK	18
4	Henrik Skouboe	Næstved IF	17
5	Stig Andersen	KB	16
6	Klaus Berggreen	Lyngby BK	12
=	Flemming Iversen	Esbjerg fB	12
=	Lars Bastrup	Aarhus GF	12
9	Erik Rasmussen	Herfølge BK	11
10	Anders Bjerregaard	Ikast fS	10
=	Jørgen Kirk	Hvidovre IF	10
=	Frank Faber	Esbjerg fB	10
=	Jan Jacobsen	Køge BK	10
=	Jens Kolding	B 93	10
