= Tadeusz Gapiński =

Polish footballer (1948–2026)

Personal information
- Full name: Tadeusz Stefan Gapiński
- Date of birth: 7 January 1948
- Place of birth: Łódź, Poland
- Date of death: 30 July 2026 (aged 78)
- Height: 1.75 m (5 ft 9 in)
- Positions: Midfielder; forward

Youth career
- 1958–1962: ŁKS Łódź
- 1964–1966: MKS Hala Łódź

Senior career*
Years	Team	Apps	(Gls)
1966–1971	ŁKS Łódź		
1971–1973	Zawisza Bydgoszcz		
1973–1979	Widzew Łódź	105	(12)
1978–1981	Hvidovre IF		

Managerial career
- 1981–1987: Widzew Łódź (assistant)
- * Club domestic league appearances and goals

Tadeusz Gapiński (7 January 1948 – 30 July 2026) was a Polish footballer. He died on 30 July 2026, at the age of 78.
