= Nicolai Clausen (footballer) =

Danish footballer (born 1995)

Personal information
- Date of birth: 10 June 1995 (age 31)
- Place of birth: Ejby, Denmark
- Position: Left-back

Team information
- Current team: Hvidovre
- Number: 23

Youth career
- BSF

Senior career*
Years	Team	Apps	(Gls)
2014–2015	BSF		
2015–2018	Greve		
2018–2019	AB	11	(0)
2019–2021	Brønshøj	43	(2)
2021–	Hvidovre	81	(6)
- * Club domestic league appearances and goals as of 2 June 2026

Nicolai Clausen (born 10 June 1995) is a Danish professional footballer who plays as a left-back for Danish 1st Division club Hvidovre IF.

== Career ==
Clausen is a product of BSF, where he also started his senior career at in 2014, playing in the Denmark Series. In the summer 2015, he moved to Greve Fodbold, who also played in the Denmark Series. Ahead of the 2018–19 season, Clausen then joined Danish 2nd Division side Akademisk Boldklub, where he played for one year.

After leaving AB, Clausen joined another 2nd Division club, Brønshøj Boldklub, on a one-year deal. In the summer 2020, he extended his contract with one further year, after playing 23 games in his first season.

On 31 August 2021, Clausen joined Danish 1st Division side Hvidovre IF. In his first season at the club, he made 10 league appearances and 3 in the cup. After a good start to the 2022–23 season, Clausen was rewarded in December 2022 with a new contract, signing until June 2024. Clausen ended up playing 16 games and scoring one goal, contributing to Hvidovre's promotion to the 2023-24 Danish Superliga. Clausen, however, sat out with an injury for almost half of the 2022–23 season until November 2023. He was only back in the squad on 3 December 2023, in a match against Brøndby IF, where he made his comeback match and his debut in the top Danish league.
