= Avedøre Airfield =

Airfield in Denmark

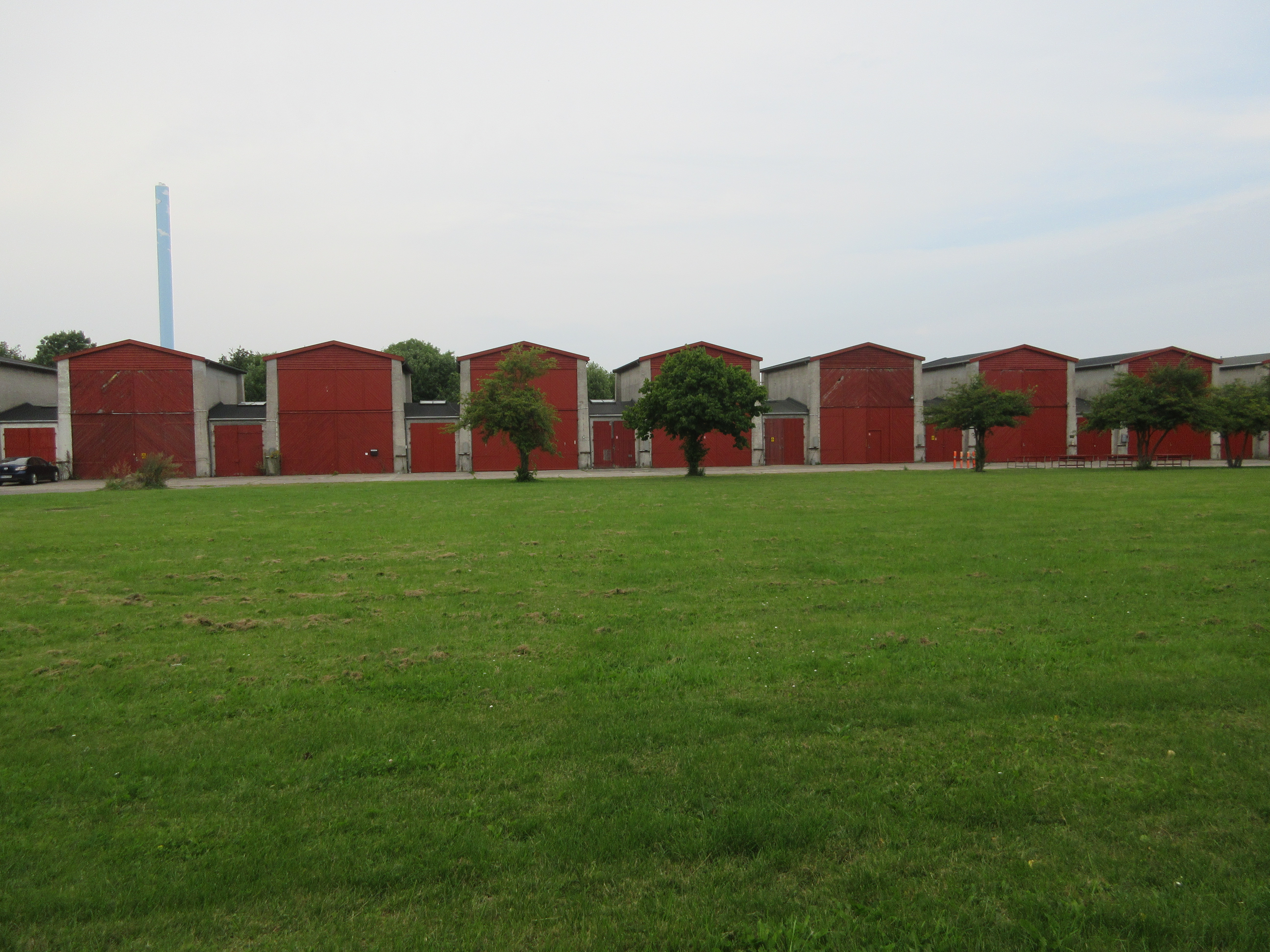
Avedøre Airfield

Avedøre Airfield (Danish: Avedøre Flyveplads), located in Hvidovre Municipality, west of central Copenhagen, is the oldest operational airfield in Denmark. It is situated at the intersection of Gammel Køge Landevej with the Ring 3 motorway. It is now known s Aeronautisk Aktivitetscenter Avedøre (AAA) and used as a centre for vintage aircraft. The oldest buildings at the site are two wooden hangars that date from its establishment in 1917.

== History ==
Avedøre Air Base was built for the Royal Danish Army's air squad in 1917. It originally covered an area of 500 by 500 metres and included runways and three hangars. One of the hangars was demolished in connection with an expansion of Gammel Køge Landevej in the 1930s.

Twelve Avro 504 aircraft were stationed at the air base but flying was limited due to shortage of fuel and spare parts during World War I. Shortly after the war, Det Danske Luftfartsselskab (later Scandinavian Airlines) used the airfield for its first civilian test flights. The Royal Danish Navy's air squad briefly operated out of Avedøre in 1921–23 before moving its activities to Kastrup. The premises were then taken over by the 6th Artillery Unit. The hangars were used for storage and the runways as a training ground. Værløse Air Base was inaugurated in 1934, shortly after the foundation of the Royal Danish Air Force.

Avedøre Airfield was taken over by the occupying German Forces during World War II. The site was used for testing of bomber engines after repairs at A/S Nordwerk, a collaborationist company based in Copenhagen. The managing director of A/S Nordwerk was shot in 1945 a few kilometres from the airfield.

After the war, the site was used as a storage facility by the Avedørelejren military installation and Hvidovre Municipality. There were plans to redevelop the site in the 1980s but it was instead decided to use it for recreational purposes.

Avedøre Airfield was put up for sale by the government-owned property company Freja Ejendomme in December 2017.

== Buildings ==
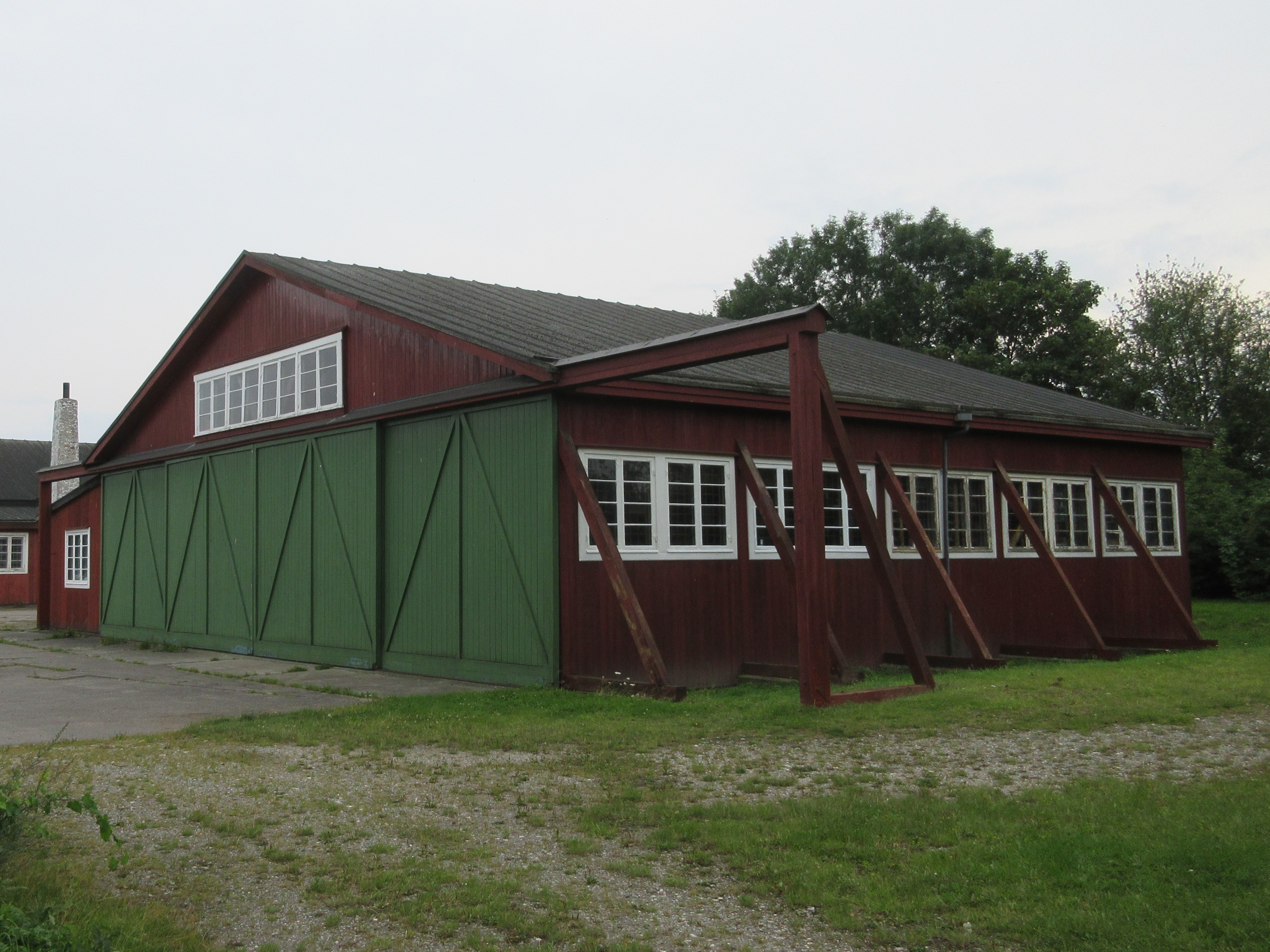
The northern of the two hangars from 1917

The two red painted hangars from 1917 were listed in 1976. They were constructed in timber so that they could easily be burned down in the event of war. The site also features an engine testing facility from 1943. Almost a hundred metres long, it consists of a row of 10 interconnected testing halls. A vintage aircraft from 1958 has been installed on the top of a column in front of the buildings.

== Activities ==
The airfield is today used by various clubs associated with aircraft and aircraft history, collectively known as Aeronautisk Aktivitetscenter Avedøre (AAA). The hangars are used for restoration of vintage aircraft. The current runway opened in 2004. Avedøre Airfield also hosts an annual air show. The clubs arrange tours of the airfield.

== See also ==
- Kløvermarken
- Værløse Air Base
- Hangar H
