= Andreas Smed =

Danish footballer (born 1997)

Personal information
- Full name: Andreas Kiel Smed
- Date of birth: 19 March 1997 (age 29)
- Place of birth: Denmark
- Position: Winger

Team information
- Current team: Hvidovre
- Number: 22

Youth career
- Vanløse
- HIK
- 2015–2016: → Copenhagen (loan)

Senior career*
Years	Team	Apps	(Gls)
2013–2020	HIK	90	(33)
2020–2021	Helsingør	19	(0)
2021	Frem	13	(3)
2021–	Hvidovre	136	(17)
- * Club domestic league appearances and goals as of 2 June 2026

Andreas Kiel Smed (born 19 March 1997) is a Danish footballer who plays as a winger for Danish 1st Division club Hvidovre IF.

== Career ==
=== HIK ===
Andreas Smed came to HIK from Vanløse IF as an U17 player. Already as a 16-year-old, Smed made his debut for HIK's first team in the 2013–14 Danish 2nd Divisions, where he participated in a total of two matches. In February 2015, after being even more involved in the squad, 17-year-old Smed signed a deal until June 2016 with HIK. In May 2015, HIK announced that Smed had been promoted to the first team squad.

In the spring of 2015, young Smed scored six goals in 10 games in the Danish 2nd Division. Due to his young age, Smed attracted a lot of interest. At the end of July 2015, he had his contract with HIK extended until June 2017 and was at the same time loaned to F.C. Copenhagen, where he would play for the club's U-19 team. Smed was back in HIK prior to 2016-17 and in October extended his contract until June 2018.

Smed left HIK at the end of the 2019–20 season.

=== FC Helsingør ===
On September 1, 2020, Smed signed with the Danish 1st Division side FC Helsingør until winter. Smed managed to play 10 league matches and 1 cup match for Helsingør before leaving the club at the turn of the year.

=== BK Frem ===
In January 2021, Smed was back in the Danish 2nd Division, as he signed a deal until the end of the season with Boldklubben Frem. Smed scored three goals in 13 games before leaving the club.

=== Hvidovre IF ===
In July 2021, Smed switched to 1st division club Hvidovre IF, where he was given a 1-year contract. Smed scored one goal in 22 in all tournaments. Despite the unimpressive numbers, Smed extended his contract in the summer of 2022.

In the following 2022–23 season, Smed played 29 games and scored five goals, contributing to Hvidovre's promotion to the 2023-24 Danish Superliga. On July 21, 2023, Smed made his debut in the top Danish league in a match against FC Midtjylland.
