= Hvidovre IF =

Danish football club

- Full name: Hvidovre Idrætsforening
- Nicknames: De gamle kæmper (The Old Giants); 2650 (postal code)
- Short name: HIF
- Founded: 15 October 1925; 100 years ago
- Ground: Pro Ventilation Arena, Hvidovre
- Capacity: 12,000 (4,600 seated)
- Chairman: Lennart Krimme
- Manager: Martin Retov
- League: Danish 1st Division
- 2025–26: Danish 1st Division, 5th of 12
- Website: www.hif.dk
Home colours	Away colours

Hvidovre Idrætsforening, more commonly known as Hvidovre IF (Danish pronunciation: [ˈviðˌɒwʁɐ ˌiˀˈef]) is a Danish association football club from Hvidovre, Capital Region of Denmark. The club competes in the Danish 1st Division, the second tier of Danish football, and plays its home matches at the Hvidovre Stadion.

Formed in 1925, the club has been crowned Danish champions three times, in 1966, 1973 and 1981, and have won the Danish Cup once, in 1980.

== History ==
=== 1925–1961: Beginnings ===
Hvidovre Idrætsforening was formed in 1925. Initially, the team started by playing private matches against neighbouring towns, including military teams from Avedørelejren. Hvidovre was not affiliated with any governing body, but in order to generate more interest in the matches, they organised private cup tournaments. In 1933, notable figures Johannes Nielsen and Otto Larsen recognised the abundant talent within the player roster of Hvidovre, which led them to exert additional efforts to secure the club's affiliation with the Kjøbenhavns Boldspil-Union (KBU). Their endeavours proved successful, and starting from 1934, Hvidovre became a part of the B-Division, the second tier of the regional association. To enhance their performance, the club appointed Sofus Johansen as their head coach, who came over from Frem.

The period for Hvidovre during the 1930s and 1940s was characterised by a mix of successes and challenges. They made a notable start as part of KBU, with promising players like Erdman Ziegler and the Svendsen brothers contributing to their victories. However, they also faced setbacks and missed opportunities, as shown by a crucial loss to Dragør Boldklub in 1935, thereby missing promotion to Danmarksturneringen. Despite the club having a poor economy during the late 1930s, they persevered, with Olaf Egge taking on a leadership role in training.

In 1941, Hvidovre sought to enhance their team by bringing in qualified coach Niels Hansen from the Frem youth academy, who emphasised technical skills and ball control during training sessions. They experienced notable achievements, such as winning the A-Division and Copenhagen Series, but they were not able to secure a place in Danmarksturneringen immediately. Finally, in 1949, after some years of continuous effort, Hvidovre managed to secure their place in the prestigious nationwide Danmarksturneringen.

However, their stay in the higher division was challenging, with the team constantly battling to avoid relegation. In the 1950s, the focus shifted towards developing the youth teams, which would later yield legendary players and lead to a new era for Hvidovre. The 1960s marked a turning point, with young talents coached by Niels Hansen making a swift rise to the first team. The club gained national recognition by winning DBU's first taentturnering, and players like Leif Sørensen showcased their potential.

=== 1962–1987: Golden years ===
In 1962, Hvidovre was promoted to the third division and rapidly climbed the ranks of Danish football, culminating in winning the Danish championship in 1966. The club then played its first European club tournament match on 9 November 1966, in the Inter-Cities Fairs Cup, a 5–1 away loss to Eintracht Frankfurt. In 1967, Hvidovre surprisingly eliminated Swiss champions, Basel from the European Cup with an aggregate score of 5–4. In the following round, they sensationally managed to draw Spanish powerhouse Real Madrid 2–2 in front of 40,663 spectators at Københavns Idrætspark. However, Hvidovre were helpless in the return match. In front of 90,000 spectators at Santiago Bernabéu Stadium in Madrid, Los Blancos won 4–1.

During the early 1970s, Hvidovre consistently competed for the title. In 1970, they held the top position before the final round, but lost the title to B 1903 after a defeat to Vejle Boldklub. However, in 1973, they managed to secure another championship, largely thanks to the remarkable performance of their striker, Hans Aabech, who set a scoring record with 28 goals in 22 matches. Nevertheless, after both Aabech and their coach, Arne Sørensen, departed from the club, Hvidovre were relegated from the first division the following year.

In 1979, Hvidovre made a comeback to the top league, with John Sinding taking charge as the coach. They achieved a significant milestone in 1980 by winning the Danish Cup final in a thrilling 5–3 victory over Lyngby Boldklub, and the triumph continued into the next season when they secured the third Danish championship in the club's history. Undoubtedly, the most significant match for the club during this pariod was the encounter with Serie A club Juventus in the 1982–83 European Cup. In the first leg on Danish turf, Hvidovre suffered a 4–1 defeat at Københavns Idrætspark in front of an audience of over 30,000 spectators. However, in the subsequent match at Stadio Comunale in Turin, they surprisingly managed to salvage a 3–3 draw despite being down 3–1 initially. At that point in time, Juventus boasted several players who had won the World Cup with Italy the previous summer: Dino Zoff, Claudio Gentile, Antonio Cabrini, Gaetano Scirea, Marco Tardelli, and Paolo Rossi. Furthermore, Juventus also featured Zbigniew Boniek from Poland and Michel Platini from France on their squad, both of whom had played pivotal roles in the 1982 World Cup. Hvidovre's standout player during this period was their striker, Michael Manniche, who was eventually transferred to Portuguese club Benfica in 1983. In 1984, Hvidovre succeeded in acquiring talented young goalkeeper, Peter Schmeichel, from Gladsaxe-Hero Boldklub. He would later go on to be regarded as one of the greatest goalkeepers of all time, mainly known for his successful spell at Premier League club Manchester United.

Hvidovre competed a total of 17 seasons in the Danish top division from 1965 to 1985, winning three Danish championships and one Danish Cup title during this period.

Despite being relegated from the first division in 1985, they managed to bounce back the following year with Peter Schmeichel on the team. However, Schmeichel later moved to Brøndby after the promotion, and Hvidovre was relegated once again in 1987.

=== 1988–present: Ups and downs ===
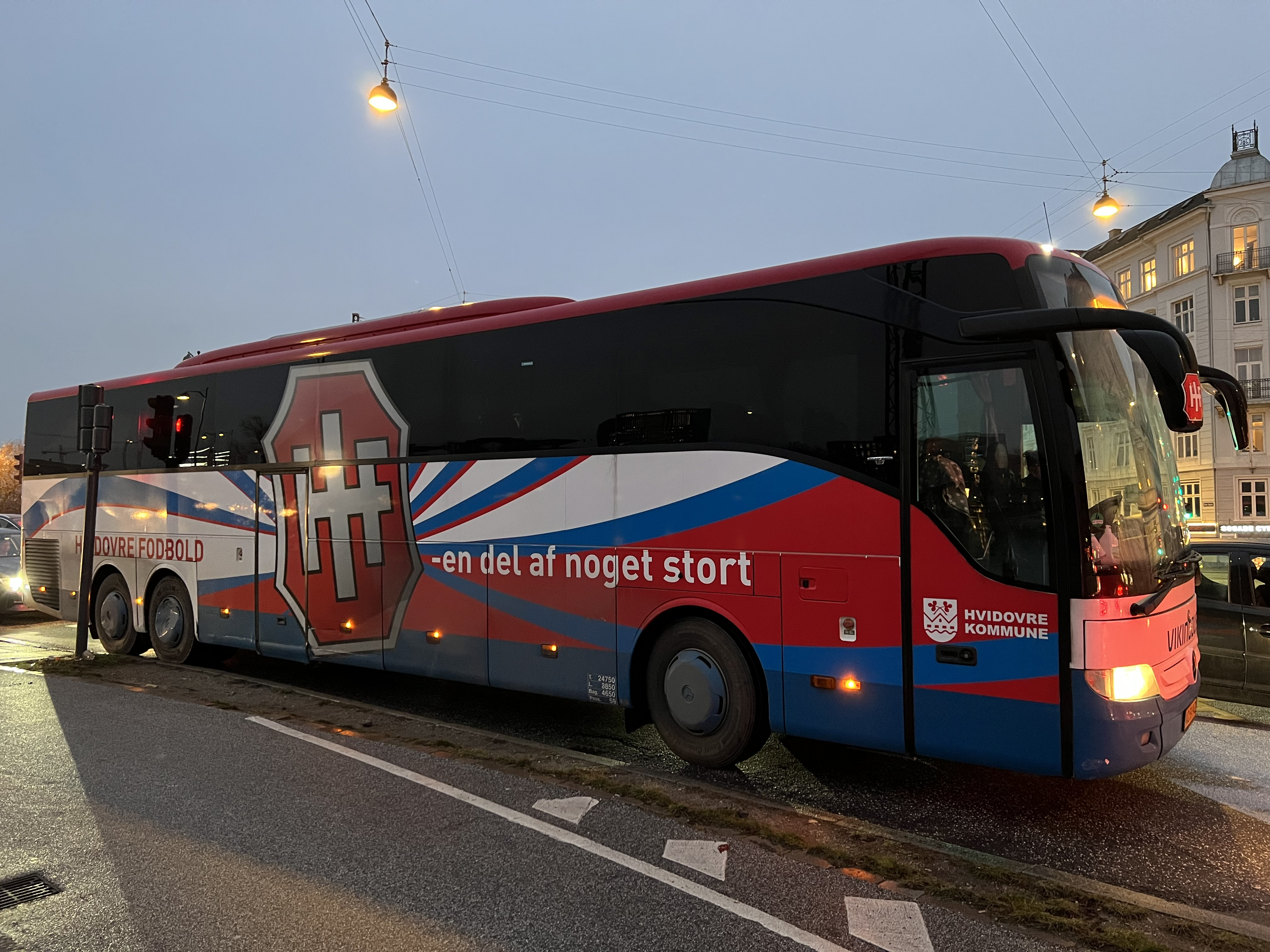
Hvidovre IF player bus at Øster Søgade, Copenhagen in 2022.

Thereafter, the club experienced a considerable downturn, resulting in their first-ever relegation to the fourth-tier Denmark Series in 1990. However, with Jan Kalborg as the head coach, the club made a comeback to the newly established top-tier, the Danish Superliga, for a solitary season in 1996–97.

From 1997 to 2003, Hvidovre played in the second-tier league, the Danish 1st Division, and during the period from 2000 to 2002, Peter Schmeichel invested in the club. Nevertheless, when the former national team goalkeeper withdrew his support from the project, the financial foundation for top-tier football crumbled, leading Hvidovre to experience another relegation to the Denmark Series in 2004. In 2007, Hvidovre returned to the Danish 1st Division after a 1–1 draw against FC Fyn.

At the end of the 2022–23 season, Hvidovre secured promotion to the Danish Superliga after Sønderjyske drew 3–3 against Næstved Boldklub. Their promotion meant a return to the first tier for the first time since 1997.

Hvidovre's return to the Superliga for the 2023–24 season proved difficult. By late October, they were at the bottom of the league with just three points from 13 games, tying a negative Superliga record. They also set a new low for the fewest goals scored after 13 games, with only five goals. Head coach Per Frandsen remarked, "The only positive is that we might be in Trivial Pursuit." The team's poor form continued, and their relegation back to the 1st Division was confirmed on 12 May 2024, following a 2–2 draw against Randers.

== Players ==
As of 19 September 2026

Note: Flags indicate national team as defined under FIFA eligibility rules; some limited exceptions apply. Players may hold more than one non-FIFA nationality.

No.	Pos.	Nation	Player
1	GK	MNE	Filip Đukić
2	DF	DEN	Daniel Stenderup (captain)
3	DF	DEN	Oliver Juul
4	MF	DEN	Zamir Aliji
6	MF	DEN	Ayo Simon Okosun
7	FW	DEN	Louka Prip
8	MF	DEN	Oliver Bjerrum Jensen
10	FW	DEN	Andreas Smed
11	FW	DEN	Donavan Bagou
14	MF	DEN	Oliver Kjærgaard
15	DF	MKD	Ahmed Iljazovski
16	GK	DEN	Marco Brylov
17	MF	DEN	Marius Papuga

No.	Pos.	Nation	Player
18	MF	DEN	Morten Knudsen
19	FW	DEN	Alexander Johansen
21	DF	DEN	Haki Bedzeti
22	MF	BEL	Nathan Huygevelde
23	DF	DEN	Nicolai Clausen
24	FW	DEN	Emmanuel Aby
25	DF	DEN	Malte Kiilerich
26	FW	CHI	Roberto Risnæs
28	DF	DEN	Nicolaj Jungvig
29	GK	DEN	Anders Ravn
45	FW	AUT	Marvin Egho
77	MF	DEN	Abdoulie Njai

=== Youth players in use 2026-27 ===
Note: Flags indicate national team as defined under FIFA eligibility rules; some limited exceptions apply. Players may hold more than one non-FIFA nationality.

No.	Pos.	Nation	Player

=== Out on loan ===
Note: Flags indicate national team as defined under FIFA eligibility rules; some limited exceptions apply. Players may hold more than one non-FIFA nationality.

No.	Pos.	Nation	Player

=== Notable former players ===
- (Denmark) Hans Aabech
- (Denmark) Kim Aabech
- (Denmark) Kenneth Brylle
- (Poland) Tadeusz Gapiński
- (Denmark) Michael Manniche
- (Denmark) John Steen Olsen
- (Denmark) Per Steffensen
- (Denmark) Peter Schmeichel
- (Denmark) Sten Ziegler

== Honours ==
- Danish Championship:
  - Winners (3): 1966, 1973, 1981
  - Runners-up (1): 1971
- Danish 1st Division:
  - Winners (1): 1995–96
  - Runners-up (1): 2022–23
- Danish 2nd Division:
  - Winners (3): 1963, 2012–13, 2017–18
  - Runners-up (1): 2011–12
- Danish Cup:
  - Winners (1): 1979–80
