= Kashif Ahmad =

Pakistani-Danish politician

Kashif Ahmad (born 1980) is a Pakistani-Danish politician and former member of the municipal council in Hvidovre Municipality. He founded the National Party with his brothers Aamer and Asif Ahmad.

In 2005, the three brothers arranged a charity concert for the victims of the 2005 Kashmir earthquake. The concert gathered 1.1 million DKK for the victims.

In January 2019, Kashif Ahmad left the National Party in favour of Alternativet. He was succeeded as party leader by his brother Asif.

Political offices
Preceded by None	National Party; 2014 - 2019	Succeeded by Asif Ahmad
