= Listed buildings in Tårnby Municipality =

This is a list of listed buildings in Tårnby Municipality, Denmark.

== The list ==
Name	Image	Location	Coordinates	Description
Hallings Gård		Vestre Bygade 9, 2770 Kastrup	55°37′44.54″N 12°26′7.4″E	Ref
Hallings Gård		Vestre Bygade 9, 2770 Kastrup	55°37′44.54″N 12°26′7.4″E	Ref
Kastrup Værk		Bryggergården 1–3, 13-14 and 17 2770 Kastrup		Ref
Kastrup Værk		Bryggergården 1–3, 13-14 and 17 2770 Kastrup		Ref
Kastrup Værk		Bryggergården 1–3, 13-14 and 17 2770 Kastrup		Ref
Kastrup Værk		Bryggergården 1–3, 13-14 and 17 2770 Kastrup		Ref
Kastrup Værk		Bryggergården 1–3, 13-14 and 17 2770 Kastrup		Ref
Kastrup Værk		Bryggergården 1–3, 13-14 and 17 2770 Kastrup		Ref
Kastrupgård		Kastrupvej 399, 2770 Kastrup	55°38′4.66″N 12°38′17.9″E	Ref
Kastrupgård		Kastrupvej 399, 2770 Kastrup	55°38′4.66″N 12°38′17.9″E	Ref
Tårnby Town Hall		Amager Landevej 76, 2770 Kastrup	55°37′2.08″N 12°37′9.73″E	Ref
Tårnby Town Hall		55°38′2.08″N 12°37′9.73″E	Amager Landevej 76, 2770 Kastrup	Ref
Tårnby Town Hall		Amager Landevej 76, 2770 Kastrup	55°37′2.08″N 12°37′9.73″E	Ref
Vilhelm Lauritzen'sTerminal		Lufthavnen 1, 2770 Kastrup	55°37′43.67″N 12°39′15.49″E	Ref
