= 1970 Danish 1st Division =

25th season of Danish 1st Division

Danish 1st Division
- Season: 1970

Statistics of Danish 1st Division in the 1970 season.

== Overview ==
It was contested by 12 teams, and Boldklubben 1903 won the championship.

== League standings ==
Pos	Team	Pld	W	D	L	GF	GA	GD	Pts
1	Boldklubben 1903	22	11	5	6	56	36	+20	27
2	Akademisk Boldklub	22	10	7	5	46	30	+16	27
3	Hvidovre IF	22	11	4	7	30	23	+7	26
4	Vejle Boldklub	22	10	3	9	45	39	+6	23
5	B 1901	22	8	7	7	31	35	−4	23
6	Boldklubben Frem	22	8	6	8	32	35	−3	22
7	Brønshøj BK	22	8	6	8	28	35	−7	22
8	Aalborg Boldspilklub	22	9	3	10	34	29	+5	21
9	Randers Sportsklub Freja	22	8	5	9	30	36	−6	21
10	Kjøbenhavns Boldklub	22	6	7	9	24	26	−2	19
11	Boldklubben 1913	22	6	6	10	24	37	−13	18
12	Horsens fS	22	4	7	11	20	39	−19	15

== Results ==
Home \ Away	ABK	AaB	B01	B03	B13	BBK	BKF	HFS	HIF	KB	RSF	VBK
Akademisk BK	—	0–3	2–3	4–2	4–0	4–1	1–2	3–2	0–1	1–1	3–2	1–4
Aalborg BK	1–3	—	3–0	1–3	0–2	2–0	6–1	0–1	2–2	3–2	2–2	1–4
B 1901	0–5	0–0	—	0–1	5–1	1–1	3–1	2–1	1–3	1–0	1–2	2–0
B 1903	2–2	3–2	4–0	—	3–2	2–2	2–2	6–1	2–3	0–1	4–0	2–2
B 1913	0–0	1–0	0–0	3–1	—	1–1	2–2	2–1	0–1	2–3	2–1	4–2
Brønshøj BK	0–3	1–0	2–2	4–5	3–1	—	1–0	1–1	1–0	1–0	2–1	1–4
BK Frem	1–1	1–0	1–3	2–2	3–1	1–0	—	4–0	3–2	1–1	0–1	3–0
Horsens fS	2–2	0–1	0–0	2–1	1–0	1–1	1–1	—	1–1	1–3	0–2	0–3
Hvidovre IF	0–2	1–0	3–0	0–2	0–0	1–0	2–0	3–1	—	0–0	3–1	1–2
Kjøbenhavns BK	0–2	1–2	2–2	1–0	0–0	2–0	1–2	1–2	2–0	—	0–0	1–2
Randers Freja	0–0	0–2	3–3	1–6	3–0	2–3	3–0	1–0	0–2	0–0	—	2–1
Vejle BK	3–3	1–3	0–2	1–3	3–0	1–2	2–1	1–1	3–1	4–2	2–3	—

Legend: Blue = home team win; Yellow = draw; Red = away team win.
