= Hangar H =

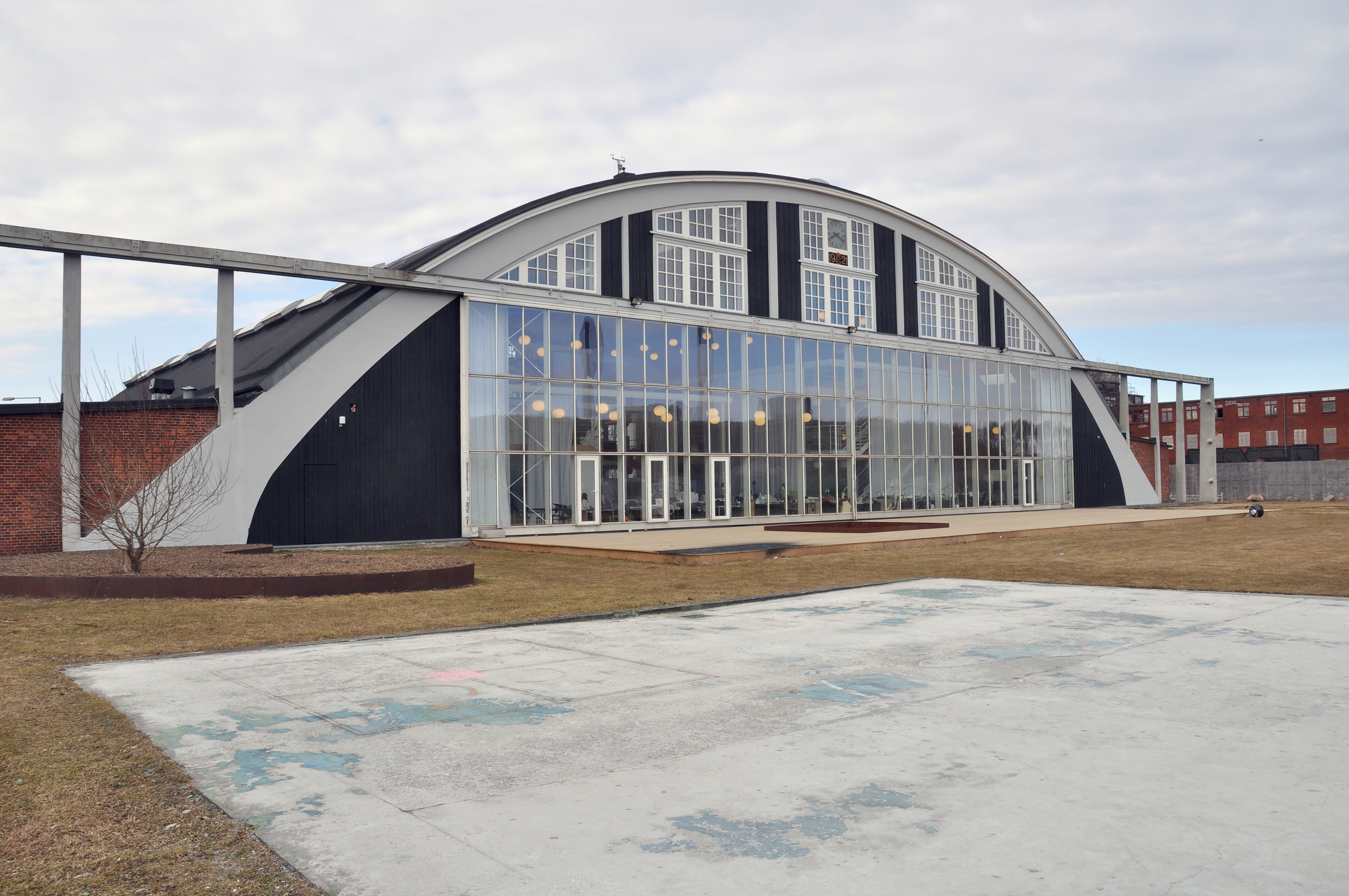
Hangar H in 2011

Hangar H is a listed hangar located on Magretheholm in Copenhagen, Denmark.

== History ==
Magretheholm was the last of the major reclamnations to take place at the Holmen naval base. Located outside Christianshavn Rampart, it was made during World War I for a new facility for seaplanes. Then known as Seaplane Hangar H53, Hangar H was designed by Christian Olrik and built in 1921. It was originally known as Then known as Hangar H53 and used for seaplanes. Marinens Flyvevæsen was based at the site until 1950 when it was transferred to the newly founded Royal Danish Air Force.

It was adapted for use as a company headquarters by Dorte Mandrup in 2000.

== Current use ==
Hangar H is now used by Danmarks Designskole.

== See also ==
- Vilhelm Lauritzen's Terminal
