= Avedørelejren =

Former military base in Denmark

Coordinates: 55.633°N 12.449°E

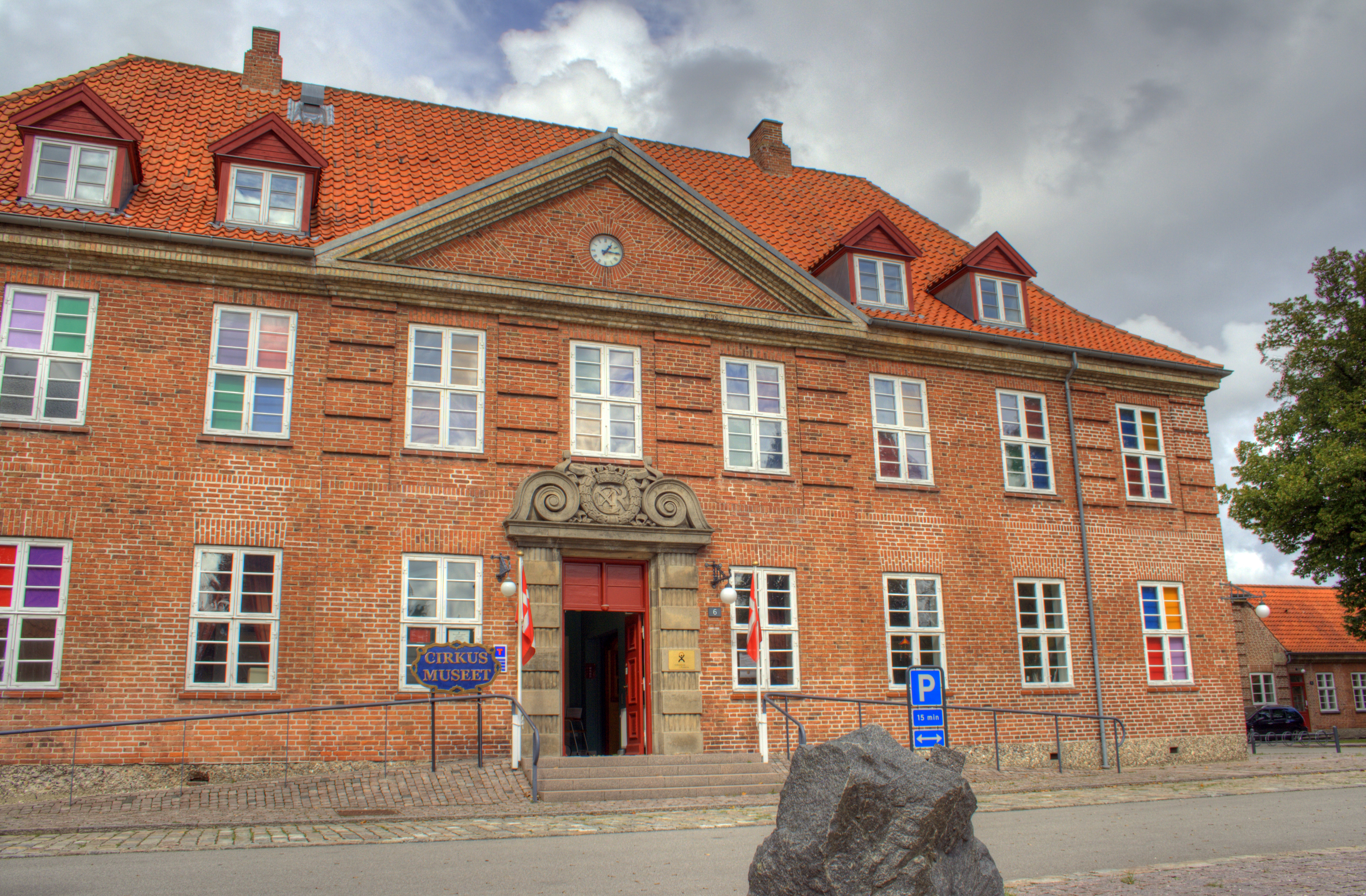
The Commander's House, now home to the Circus Museum

Avedørelejren is a former military base in Avedøre, Hvidovre Municipality, some 10 km west of Copenhagen, Denmark. It has now been converted into a mixed-use development. It is home to Filmbyen and the Circus Museum.

== History ==
The military camp was built between 1911 and 1913 to a design by Helge Boysen-Møller. It was originally only intended for use during the summer season. The installation has over the years been home to a wide range of military units. It closed in 1995. The buildings were then sold to Hvidovre Municipality (80%) and the film company Zentropa.

== Description ==
The street Filmbyen bisects the area. The buildings in the southern part of the area are generally built in red brick. This area is home to the oldest surviving buildings. They were designed by the architect Viggo Møller with inspiration from the Bedre Byggeskik movement. They have been combined with new housing and a day care. The northern part of the area mostly consists of former workshop buildings in yellow brickwork.

== See also ==
- Østerfælled Barracks
