= 1966 Danish 1st Division =

21st season of Danish 1st Division

Danish 1st Division
- Season: 1966

Statistics of Danish 1st Division in the 1966 season.

== Overview ==
It was contested by 12 teams, and Hvidovre IF won the championship.

== League standings ==
Pos	Team	Pld	W	D	L	GF	GA	GD	Pts
1	Hvidovre IF	22	11	9	2	40	16	+24	31
2	Boldklubben Frem	22	11	5	6	33	22	+11	27
3	Kjøbenhavns Boldklub	22	10	5	7	40	32	+8	25
4	Aarhus Gymnastikforening	22	11	3	8	45	41	+4	25
5	Vejle Boldklub	22	9	5	8	44	41	+3	23
6	Akademisk Boldklub	22	9	3	10	35	29	+6	21
7	Esbjerg fB	22	8	5	9	35	36	−1	21
8	Boldklubben 1903	22	8	5	9	29	33	−4	21
9	Aalborg Boldspilklub	22	9	2	11	32	32	0	20
10	Køge BK	22	8	3	11	40	45	−5	19
11	Boldklubben 1909	22	6	4	12	35	59	−24	16
12	Boldklubben 1913	22	5	5	12	26	48	−22	15

== Results ==
Home \ Away	ABK	AaB	AGF	B03	B09	B13	EFB	BKF	HIF	KB	KBK	VBK
Akademisk BK	—	4–1	3–1	2–0	5–1	2–2	3–1	2–2	0–2	0–2	5–0	2–2
Aalborg BK	2–0	—	3–0	1–2	2–4	5–1	2–0	1–0	0–2	2–0	2–3	1–3
Aarhus GF	2–1	0–2	—	0–1	3–1	3–1	4–2	2–2	1–1	1–4	3–2	3–0
B 1903	0–1	3–0	2–3	—	0–2	3–2	4–1	0–2	1–1	0–0	1–1	1–6
B 1909	1–0	2–0	1–1	3–2	—	2–2	0–4	1–4	2–6	0–1	2–0	0–3
B 1913	0–3	1–0	2–4	1–2	3–0	—	1–1	0–0	1–1	0–2	2–1	1–0
Esbjerg fB	2–0	1–1	1–4	0–0	4–2	4–1	—	1–2	0–0	1–0	4–1	2–0
BK Frem	0–1	1–0	0–2	3–1	4–1	2–1	1–0	—	0–0	2–1	4–0	0–2
Hvidovre IF	1–0	0–1	2–0	2–0	3–0	5–0	2–2	0–0	—	2–2	3–0	0–0
Kjøbenhavns BK	2–0	1–1	3–1	0–1	5–3	2–0	5–2	1–2	2–4	—	2–1	2–2
Køge BK	3–1	4–1	4–2	1–1	2–2	2–4	1–2	2–0	1–2	5–1	—	5–1
Vejle BK	2–0	0–4	3–5	1–4	5–5	4–0	2–0	3–2	3–1	2–2	0–1	—

Legend: Blue = home team win; Yellow = draw; Red = away team win.
