= Lars Clemmensen =

Lars Bjørn Clemmensen (born October, 31st in Copenhagen) is a Danish Professor of Sedimentology in the Department of Geosciences and Natural Resource Management, Copenhagen University. Lars was born in Valby (Copenhagen) and grew up in Hvidovre, before moving to Frederiksberg. He extensively worked with the geology of Greenland, mostly on the Late Triassic of Jameson Land, in East Greenland. He was part of 10 expeditions to Greenland. With a publication record over 100 titles that grant him an h-index of 27 mainly on sedimentology and stratigraphy. In 1997 a new mammal from the Triassic of East Greenland was named after him: Haramiyavia clemmenseni. Co-author of the species Cyclotosaurus naraserluki.

He also worked on the ancient aeolian dunes of Scotland and USA. In his later years he has worked with Danish coastal systems: beach ridges, dunes and storm events.
