= Hvidovre =

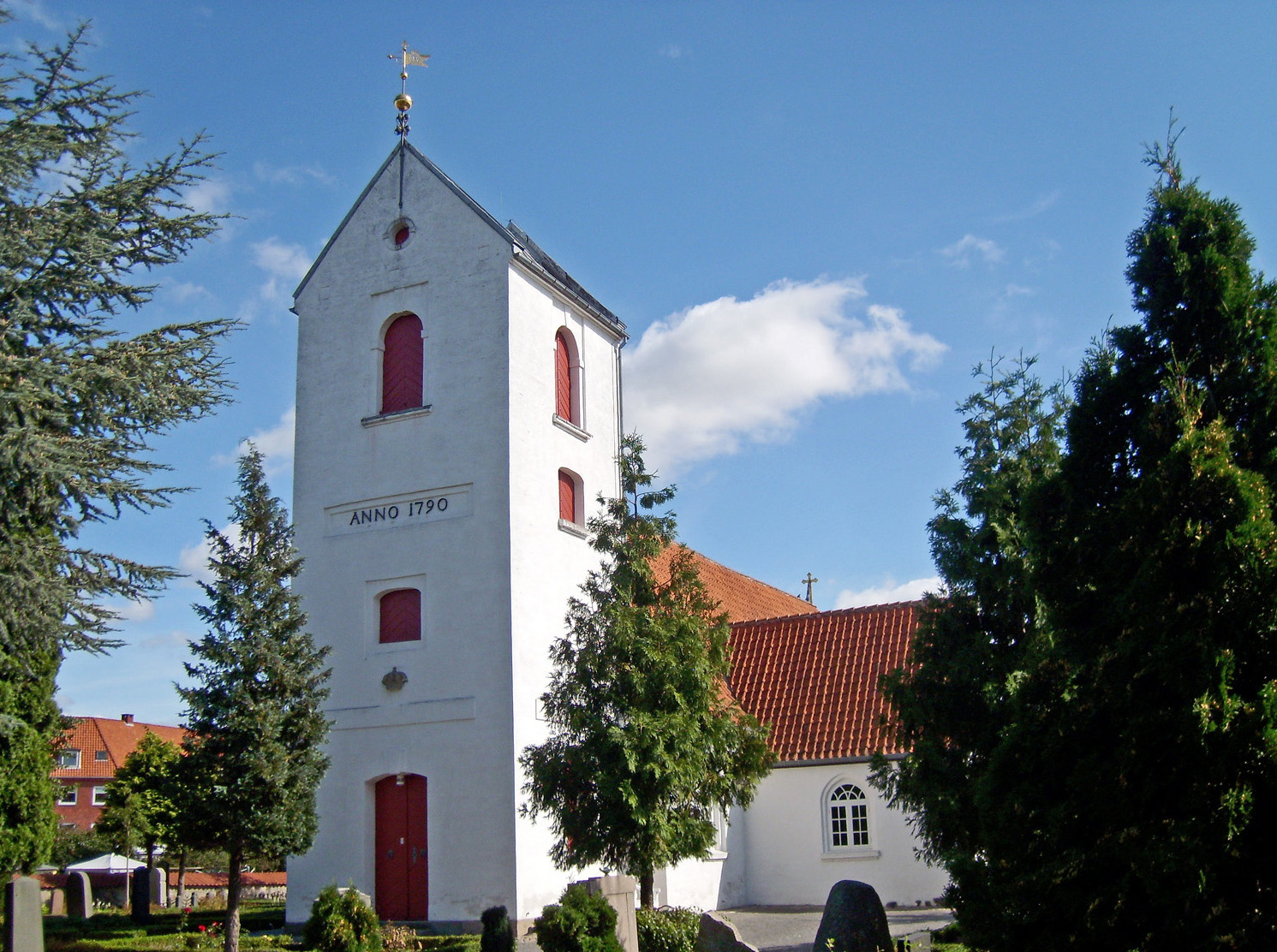
- Hvidovre Church in the summer

- Location within Greater Copenhagen Location within Denmark
- Coordinates: 55°38′33″N 12°28′38″E
- Country: Denmark
- Region: Capital Region
- Municipalities: Hvidovre

Area
  - City: 22.84 km^{2} (8.82 sq mi)
- Highest elevation: 25 m (82 ft)
- Lowest elevation: 1 m (3.3 ft)

Population (1 January 2020)
  - City: 53,527
  - Density: 2,344/km^{2} (6,070/sq mi)
- Time zone: UTC+01:00 (CET)
  - Summer (DST): UTC+02:00 (CEST)
- Postal code: 2650

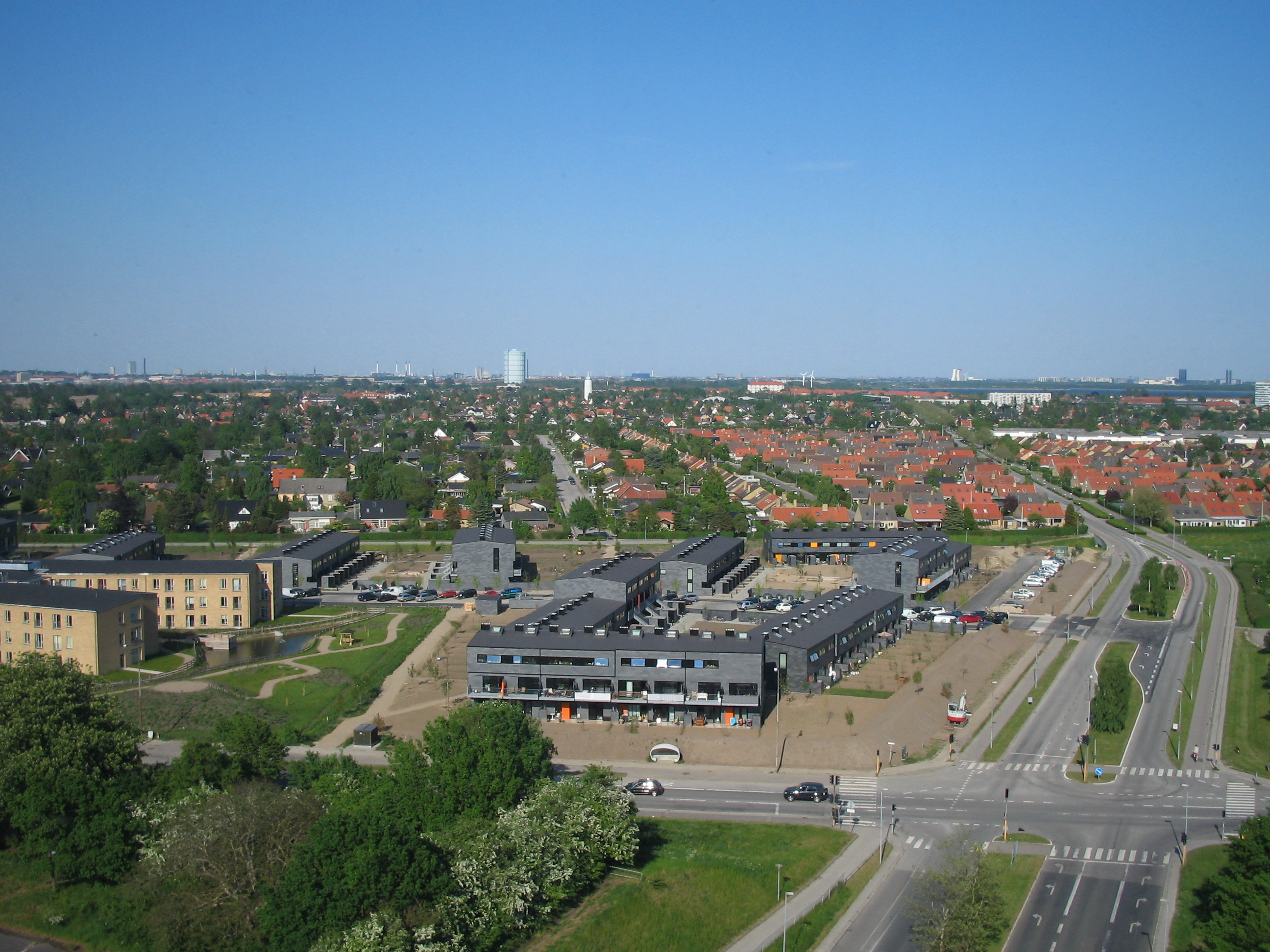
Hvidovre from Store Hus in Avedøre

Hvidovre is the main town in Hvidovre Municipality, Denmark. The town, a suburb of Copenhagen, is about 10 km southwest of the capital's center. It is the 2nd biggest suburb of Copenhagen, only beaten by Frederiksberg.

== History ==
Hvidovre has been inhabited since prehistoric times. In 1929, a 3,500-year-old sword from the Bronze Age was excavated in Hvidovre.

A farm, Ovre (Aworthe), was located in the area in about 1170 when Esbern Snare gave it to Sorø Abbey that later passed it on to Bishop Absalon. A church was built during the Romanesque period. The name Hvidovre, meaning White Ovre, refers to the colour of the church, which was built in white chalk, as opposed to the one in Rødovre, Red Ovre, which was built in red brick.

Hvidovre did not become a real village until the mid 1600s. In 1682 Hvidovre consisted of 18 farms and 14 houses without any agricultural land. Back then only a few crops were grown in the area. In 1635 it consisted of the following: 12% rye, 58% barley and 30% oat.

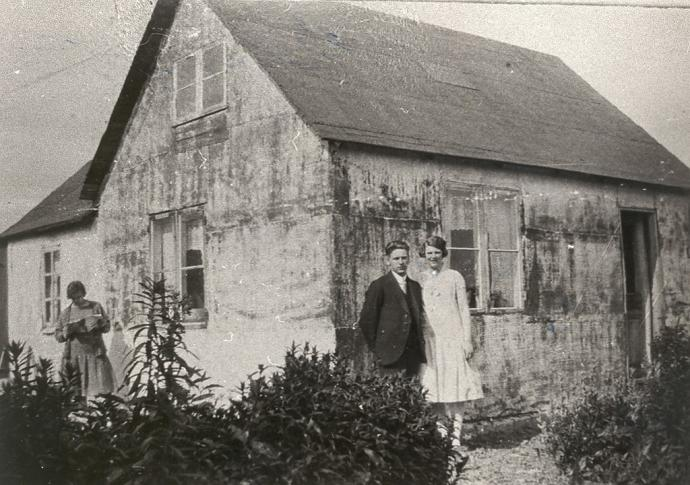
A "Ford box house"building

Some of the land closest to the border with Copenhagen was converted into allotments in the 1920s. At the end of World War I, Copenhagen suffered from a severe housing shortage. Many of the farmers in Hvidovre saw it as an opportunity to make a substantial profit by selling their land off in small lots. 3,226 out of the 3,899 lots that existed in Hvidovre in 1924 had been sold off since 1918. The buyers were typically workers from Copenhagen and the houses often built out of Chevrolet or Ford boxes, which had been used in the shipping of car parts from America. The boxes were cheap and delivered on the site. Others lived in already existing summer houses. The settlement was not legal but by 1923 accounted for 34% of the population in the municipality.

In May 1945, a few days before the end of World War II, a gun fight took place on the street of Hvidovrevej between Resistance fighters and members of the HIPO Corps.

=== Population ===
At the turn of the 20th century, Hvidovre was still a quiet rural community. In 1901, the parish still only had a population of 500. But It quickly began its growth from there. In 1930 Hvidovre had a population of 6,523. It had then nearly doubled in 1940 to 12,014 people just before World War II. Fortunately, Hvidovre did not stop growing because of World War II. It again doubled its population in just 10 years with just over 23,000 people in 1950. In 1960 Hvidovre had a population of 38,411. From there Hvidovre stopped its fast growth, as did much of the rest of the country. And now in 2020 Hvidovre has a population of 53,527.

=== Urban development planning ===
The progressive urban development also had an impact on urban planning. When the so-called "Finger Plan" - Sketch proposal for Regional Plan for Greater Copenhagen - was published in 1947 with its proposal to gather the future urban development in the capital area along railway lines, it was also assumed that Hvidovre could grow and in the long term form a cohesive suburban area together with Avedøre and Brøndbyøster. The finger plan led to the adoption of the Urban Regulation Act in 1949, which presupposed the establishment of an urban development committee for the Copenhagen area to plan the future urban development in the Greater Copenhagen area in the form of a so-called urban development plan.

On 6 October 1949, an urban development committee for the Copenhagen area was set up, which on 2 May 1951 published "Report concerning Partial Urban Development Plan no. 2 for the Copenhagen area's urban development area". As Hvidovre was already partially developed and was directly adjacent to areas with S-train service to the north and south, the city was designated as one of the places that was suitable for urban development in terms of traffic, and under the impression that the area was developed in the form of sewerage, and that the urban development was assumed not to be in conflict with conservation and outdoor interests, as a green corridor around Harrestrup Å was kept free and assumed to provide access to the coast at Køge Bay, the entire designated urban development area adjacent to Hvidovre was placed in the inner zone, that means it could be built on when and if, the municipal council wanted it.

The original urban development plan was later updated with "Report regarding Partial Urban Development Plan no. 9 for the Copenhagen area's urban development area" from 1972, which for Hvidovre, however, only confirmed the previous plan and urban development took place.

== Sport ==
=== Football ===
The city is nationally known for its achievements in sports, especially for its football team, Hvidovre IF. It is the birthplace of Daniel Agger, Thomas Kahlenberg, Michael Krohn-Dehli and Jannik Vestergaard. Hvidovre IF has been the Danish Football champion multiple times, the first time in 1966 and most recently in 1981. The club also won the Danish Cup in 1980. In 1967 they made it to the European Cup, beating the former champions FC Basel 5–4. They came up with a result of 2–2 at home in the next round against Real Madrid, but on the road against Real Madrid Hvidovre were beaten 5–1 in front of 90,000 fans. They're now in the Danish 1st Division.

=== Other sports ===
They also have a well-known curling club, ice hockey club, badminton club and a club for athletics.

== Culture ==
A film-production camp Filmbyen (founded by Lars von Trier and Peter Aalbæk Jensen's company Zentropa) is located in Hvidovre, which has been described as "a peculiar post-industrial filmmaking hub".

== Geography ==
Hvidovre is located just above the 55th Northern Parallel and east of the 12th eastern meridian. It borders Copenhagen to the east, Køge Bay to the south, Brøndby to the west and Rødovre towards north. Hvidovre is like the rest of the country, very flat. Its highest natural point is 25 m (68 ft). The tallest building in Hvidovre, Rebæk Søpark, reaches a height of just 53 m. Though the tallest structure is the nearly 150 m (492 ft) tall chimney of the Avedøre Power Station.

Hvidovre is located next to plenty of water. Hvidovre has a coastline that is more 15 km long and also holds a small 20-km-long river that starts in Albertslund, then flows through Damhus Lake and enters into Hvidovre from Rødovre, which is where it later flows out into the sea. On that coastline you find both two small cozy harbors. Hvidovre Havn and Brøndby Havn. Most people may think that Brøndby Havn is in Brøndby, but it is actually part of Hvidovre Municipality, and therefore the city of Hvidovre.

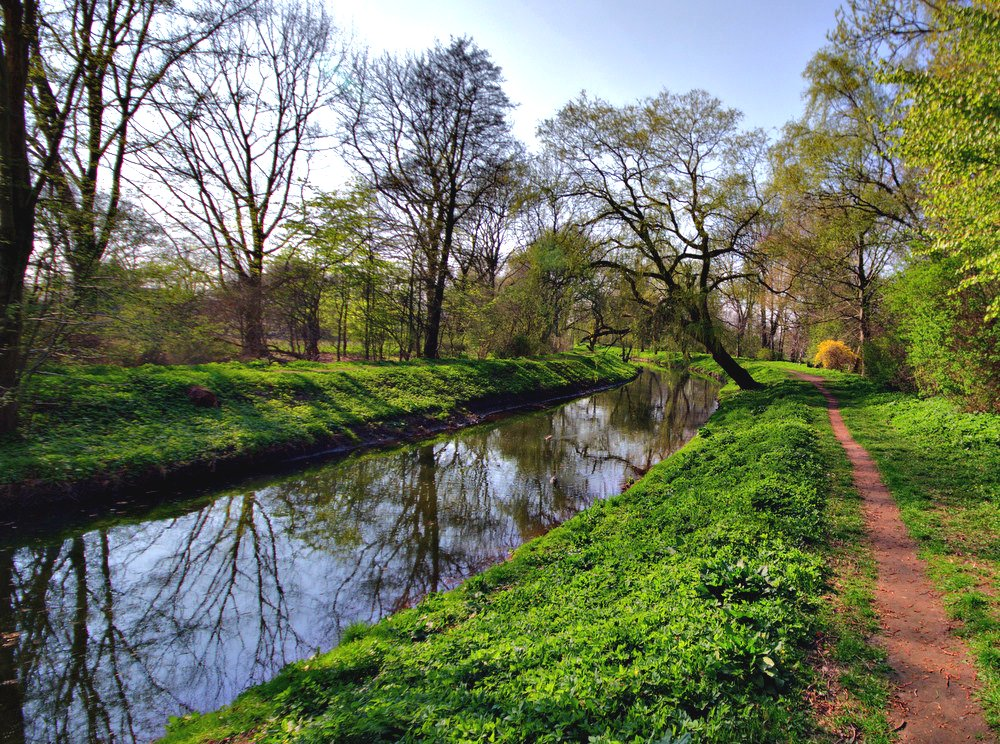
Harrestrup Å in Hvidovre

Hvidovre is part of the Copenhagen Vestegn. It is a term used for the suburbs west of Copenhagen. Copenhagen's Vestegn is often seen as a more dangerous and less wealthy area of Copenhagen. While that's partly true there are also areas of Copenhagen's Vestegn, that are far above the country's average in terms of quality of living.

=== Climate ===
Hvidovre is in the Warm-summer Mediterranean climate zone (Köppen: Cfb). Apart from slightly higher rainfall from October to December, precipitation is moderate. While snowfall occurs mainly from late December to early March, it is still a rare occurrence, as there's only just above 5 snowy days a year, for this reason it mostly rains even in winter, with average temperatures well above freezing point.

May is the sunniest month of the year with an average just below 10 hours every day. July and August are the warmest months with an average daytime high of 26 °C (79 °F). By contrast, the average hours of sunshine are less than two per day in November and only one and a half per day in December and January. In the spring, it gets warmer again with five to ten hours of sunshine per day from March to May. April is the driest month of the year. Rare weather conditions can bring as much as 50 cm (20 in) of snow to Hvidovre in a 24-hour period during the winter months while summer temperatures have been known to rise to heights of 33, 34, 35 and with the record being 36.4 °C (97.5 °F) which occurred on 10 August 1975.

Because of Hvidovre's northern latitude, the number of daylight hours varies considerably between summer and winter. On the summer solstice, the sun rises at 05:26 and sets at 22:58, providing 17 hours 32 minutes of daylight. On the winter solstice, it rises at 08:39 and sets at 15:41 with 7 hours and 1 minute of daylight. There is therefore a difference of 10 hours and 31 minutes in the length of days and nights between the summer and winter solstices.

Climate data for Hvidovre, Denmark (2010-2023 normals, extremes 1768–present)
Month	Jan	Feb	Mar	Apr	May	Jun	Jul	Aug	Sep	Oct	Nov	Dec	Year
Record high °C (°F)	13.2 (55.8)	16.0 (60.8)	22.2 (72.0)	28.6 (83.5)	32.8 (91.0)	35.5 (95.9)	35.9 (96.6)	36.4 (97.5)	32.4 (90.3)	27.1 (80.8)	18.5 (65.3)	14.5 (58.1)	36.4 (97.5)
Mean maximum °C (°F)	10.2 (50.4)	11.4 (52.5)	15.3 (59.5)	22.2 (72.0)	26.4 (79.5)	31.5 (88.7)	32.4 (90.3)	30.7 (87.3)	25.8 (78.4)	19.3 (66.7)	14.2 (57.6)	10.5 (50.9)	33.5 (92.3)
Mean daily maximum °C (°F)	5.2 (41.4)	6.4 (43.5)	8.8 (47.8)	14.1 (57.4)	19.6 (67.3)	24.6 (76.3)	24.9 (76.8)	24.4 (75.9)	20.3 (68.5)	14.6 (58.3)	9.2 (48.6)	5.8 (42.4)	14.8 (58.7)
Daily mean °C (°F)	3.5 (38.3)	4.2 (39.6)	5.5 (41.9)	9.5 (49.1)	14.6 (58.3)	19.4 (66.9)	20.3 (68.5)	20.1 (68.2)	16.7 (62.1)	12.0 (53.6)	7.6 (45.7)	4.3 (39.7)	11.5 (52.7)
Mean daily minimum °C (°F)	1.8 (35.2)	2.0 (35.6)	2.3 (36.1)	4.9 (40.8)	9.6 (49.3)	14.2 (57.6)	15.7 (60.3)	15.7 (60.3)	13.1 (55.6)	9.3 (48.7)	5.9 (42.6)	2.9 (37.2)	8.1 (46.6)
Mean minimum °C (°F)	−3.3 (26.1)	−3.4 (25.9)	−3.6 (25.5)	−0.3 (31.5)	3.4 (38.1)	9.6 (49.3)	12.1 (53.8)	11.4 (52.5)	7.8 (46.0)	2.7 (36.9)	−2.0 (28.4)	−3.5 (25.7)	−5.8 (21.6)
Record low °C (°F)	−10.4 (13.3)	−11.7 (10.9)	−10.2 (13.6)	−4.6 (23.7)	−1.1 (30.0)	5.3 (41.5)	7.2 (45.0)	7.7 (45.9)	3.1 (37.6)	−3.5 (25.7)	−7.0 (19.4)	−9.1 (15.6)	−11.7 (10.9)
Average precipitation mm (inches)	52 (2.0)	50 (2.0)	36 (1.4)	27 (1.1)	32 (1.3)	38 (1.5)	52 (2.0)	66 (2.6)	44 (1.7)	64 (2.5)	38 (1.5)	53 (2.1)	550.8 (21.69)
Average precipitation days (≥ 1 mm)	8	5	4	3	3	3	4	5	4	6	4	6	54
Average snowy days	1.8	2.3	0.9	0.1	0.0	0.0	0.0	0.0	0.0	0.0	0.2	1.4	6.7
Average relative humidity (%)	86	81	75	65	66	68	70	73	75	83	87	88	75
Mean monthly sunshine hours	63.4	98.3	161.0	270.2	309.9	314.7	282.7	244.9	187.6	124.4	53.9	39.0	2,149.9
Average ultraviolet index	0	1	3	4	5	7	6	6	4	2	1	0	3
Source: "Danish Meteorological Institute".

== Notable people ==
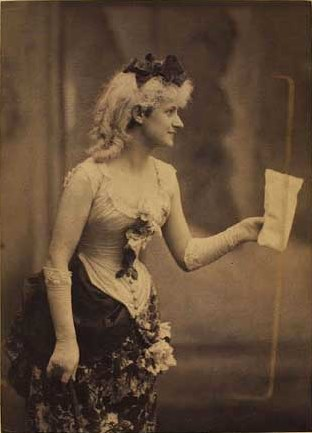
Johanne Pedersen-Dan, 1880s

- Kim Petersen a.k.a. King Diamond, lead singer and lyricist of Mercyful Fate and King Diamond, was born in Hvidovre
- Johanne Pedersen-Dan (1860–1934) a Danish actress, singer and sculptor; lived and worked in Hvidovre from 1912
- Lars Clemmensen (b. ca. 1945) a Danish Professor of Sedimentology, grew up in Hvidovre
- Robert Hansen (born 1979) a Danish actor and TV host
- Kashif Ahmad (b. 1980) a Pakistani-Danish politician and former Hvidovre Municipality councillor
- Manticora (formed in 1996) a heavy metal band from Hvidovre

=== Sport ===
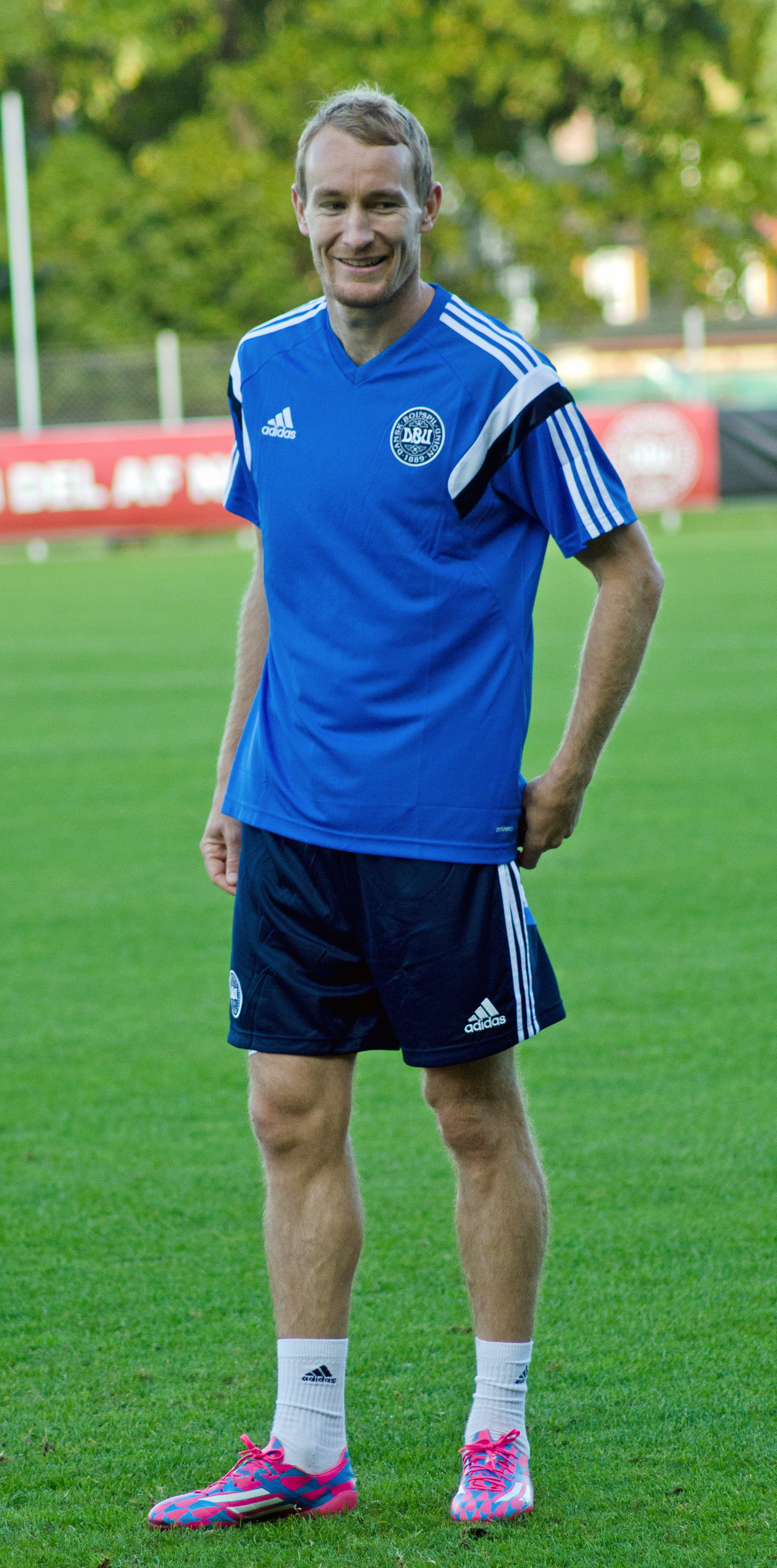
Thomas Kahlenberg, 2014

- Gert Larsen (b. 1960) a Danish curler and curling coach; ten-time Danish men's champion curler
- Michael Harry (b. 1961) a Danish curler and curling coach; seven-time Danish men's champion curler
- Lasse Lavrsen (b. 1963) a Danish curler and curling coach; seven-time Danish men's champion curler
- Johnny Frederiksen (b. 1975) a Danish curler and skip of the men's Danish national team
- Lars Krogh Jeppesen (b. 1979) a former Danish handball left back, who played over 200 club games and 123 for Denmark
- Thomas Kahlenberg (b. 1983) a former Danish footballer with 338 club caps and 47 for Denmark
- Daniel Agger (b. 1984) a Danish retired footballer with 252 club caps and 75 for Denmark
- Danny Olsen (b. 1985) a retired Danish footballer with over 300 club caps
- Henrik Kildentoft (b. 1985) a retired Danish footballer with over 250 club caps
- Kasper Lorentzen (b. 1985) a Danish retired footballer with 185 club caps and five for Denmark
- Lene Nielsen (b. 1986) a Danish curler, the skip of the 2014 Danish Olympic Curling Team
- Line Jørgensen (b. 1989) a Danish handball player for Team Esbjerg and Denmark
- Jannik Vestergaard (b. 1992) a Danish footballer who plays for Leicester City and has represented Denmark
- Julie Kepp Jensen (b. 2000) a Danish 2020 Olympic swimmer
