= Hvidovre Municipality =

Hvidovre Municipality Hvidovre Kommune (Danish)
- Municipality
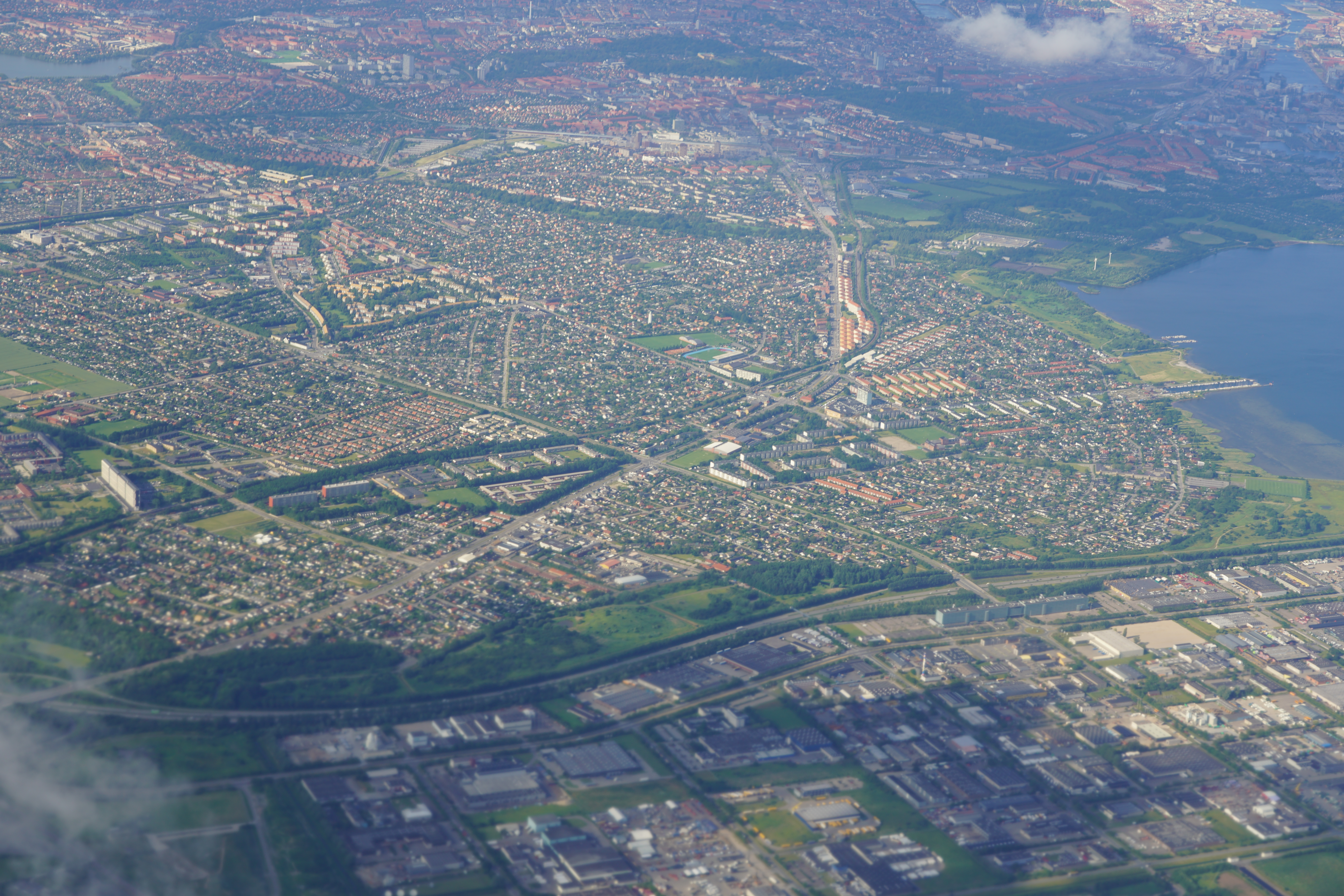

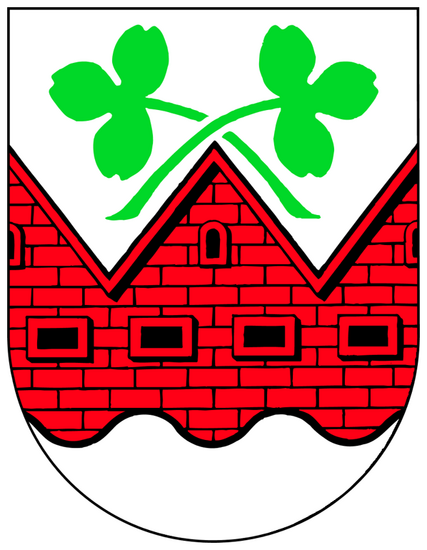
- Coat of arms

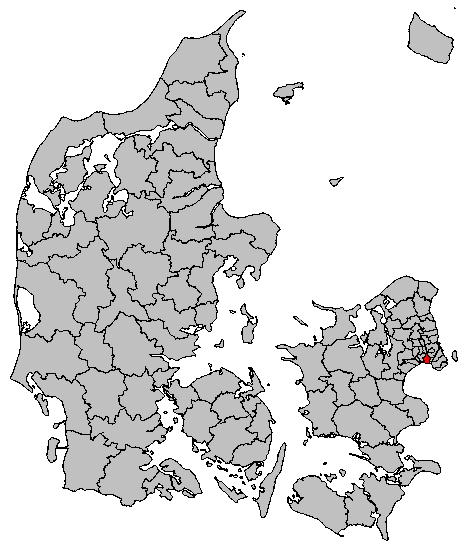
- Coordinates: 55°39′00″N 12°29′00″E
- Country: Denmark
- Region: Hovedstaden
- Established: 1 July 1858
- Seat: Hvidovre

Government
  - Mayor: Anders Wolf Andresen (SF)

Area
  - Total: 21.91 km^{2} (8.46 sq mi)

Population (1 January 2026)
  - Total: 54,228
  - Density: 2,475/km^{2} (6,410/sq mi)
- Time zone: UTC+1 (CET)
  - Summer (DST): UTC+2 (CEST)
- Postal code: 2650
- Municipal code: 167
- Website: hvidovre.dk

Hvidovre Municipality (Danish: Hvidovre Kommune) is a municipality (Danish, kommune) in the Capital Region near Copenhagen on the island of Zealand (Sjælland) in eastern Denmark. The municipality covers an area of 22 km^{2} (8.5 sq mi), and has a total population of 54,228 (1 January 2026). Its mayor is Anders Wolf Andresen, a member of the Green Left (Socialistisk Folkeparti) political party.

The main town and the site of its municipal council is the town of Hvidovre. Other towns in the municipality are Avedøre and Friheden.

Neighboring municipalities are Copenhagen to the east, Rødovre to the north, and Brøndby to the west. Part of its eastern border are the waters of Kalveboderne, and to the south is Køge Bay (Køge Bugt). The southernmost section of the municipality, known as Avedøre Holme, juts out into Køge Bay and forms part of the entryway into Kalveboderne, the waters of which separate the island of Zealand from neighboring Amager. Avedøre Holme houses two harbours.

== History ==
The parish of Hvidovre originally covered the villages of Hvidovre, Valby, and Vigerslev. The civil parish of Hvidovre ('Hvidovre Sognedistrikt' or 'Hvidovre Sognekommune') was formed in 1803. In 1841, it was merged with Frederiksberg under the name Hvidovre–Frederiksberg Sognekommune (civil parish of Hvidovre–Frederiksberg) but the two were again split in 1858 and Valby and Vigerslev were transferred to Copenhagen in 1901.

Hvidovre Municipality was established with the 1970 Danish Municipal Reform, covering the parishes of Hvidovre, Risbjerg Parish, Strandmark. Avedøre was transferred from Glostrup to Hvidovre in 1974.

Hvidovre municipality was not merged with other municipalities on 1 January 2007 as part of nationwide Kommunalreformen ("The Municipality Reform" of 2007).

== Parks and green spaces ==
Vestvolden follows the western border of Hvidovre Municipality. Avedøre Airfield from 1917 is Denmark's oldest preserved airfield. Strandengen ("The Beach Meadow") is grazed by cattle and sheep in the summer time. Other green spaces include Kystagerparken, Lodsparken, Mågeparken and Rebæk Søpark.

== The town of Hvidovre ==
The town is a suburb to Copenhagen, located approximately 10 km (6 mi) southwest of central Copenhagen. It got its name from the fact that a white church could be seen in Hvidovre— hvid means "white" in Danish. This same naming principle also applies to neighboring Rødovre municipality where a red church could be seen— rød means "red" in Danish.

The city is well known for its football team, Hvidovre IF, where famous Danish football players such as Peter Schmeichel, Kenneth Brylle, and Michael Manniche have played. Stephan Andersen with a past in Charlton, has played for the club too. It is also the birthplace of young Liverpool defender Daniel Agger and Thomas Kahlenberg.

Film production camp Filmbyen (founded by Lars von Trier and Peter Aalbæk Jensen's company Zentropa) is located in Hvidovre.

== Politics ==
=== Municipal council ===
Hvidovre's municipal council consists of 21 members, elected every four years.

Below are the municipal councils elected since the Municipal Reform of 2007.

Election	Party								Total seats	Turnout	Elected mayor
Election	A	C	F	H	O	T	V	Ø	Total seats	Turnout	Elected mayor
2005	11	1	1	2	2	2	2		21	63.7%	Milton Graff Pedersen (A)
2009	7	1	4	3	3	1	2		21	58.7%	Milton Graff Pedersen (A)
2013	8	1	1	3	5		2	1	21	68.6%	Helle M. Adelborg (A)
2017	8	2	3	2	3		2	1	21	65.9%	Helle M. Adelborg (A)
Data from Kmdvalg.dk 2005, 2009, 2013 and 2017

== Trivia ==
The longest office building in Denmark, Copenhagen Business Park, is located in the municipality at the address Stamholmen 143–161. As one of the largest office buildings in Denmark it consists of 67,000 square meters (slightly over 721,000 sq feet) rented space. It dates from 1982 and was built by Bøje Nielsen.

== Twin towns — sister cities ==
The municipality is twinned with:

Oppegård in Norway; Rydułtowy in Poland	Sollentuna in Sweden; Tuusula in Finland; Várkerület in Hungary
