= Antonin Carlès =

French sculptor

Jean-Antonin Carles (1851 – 18 February 1919) was a French sculptor.

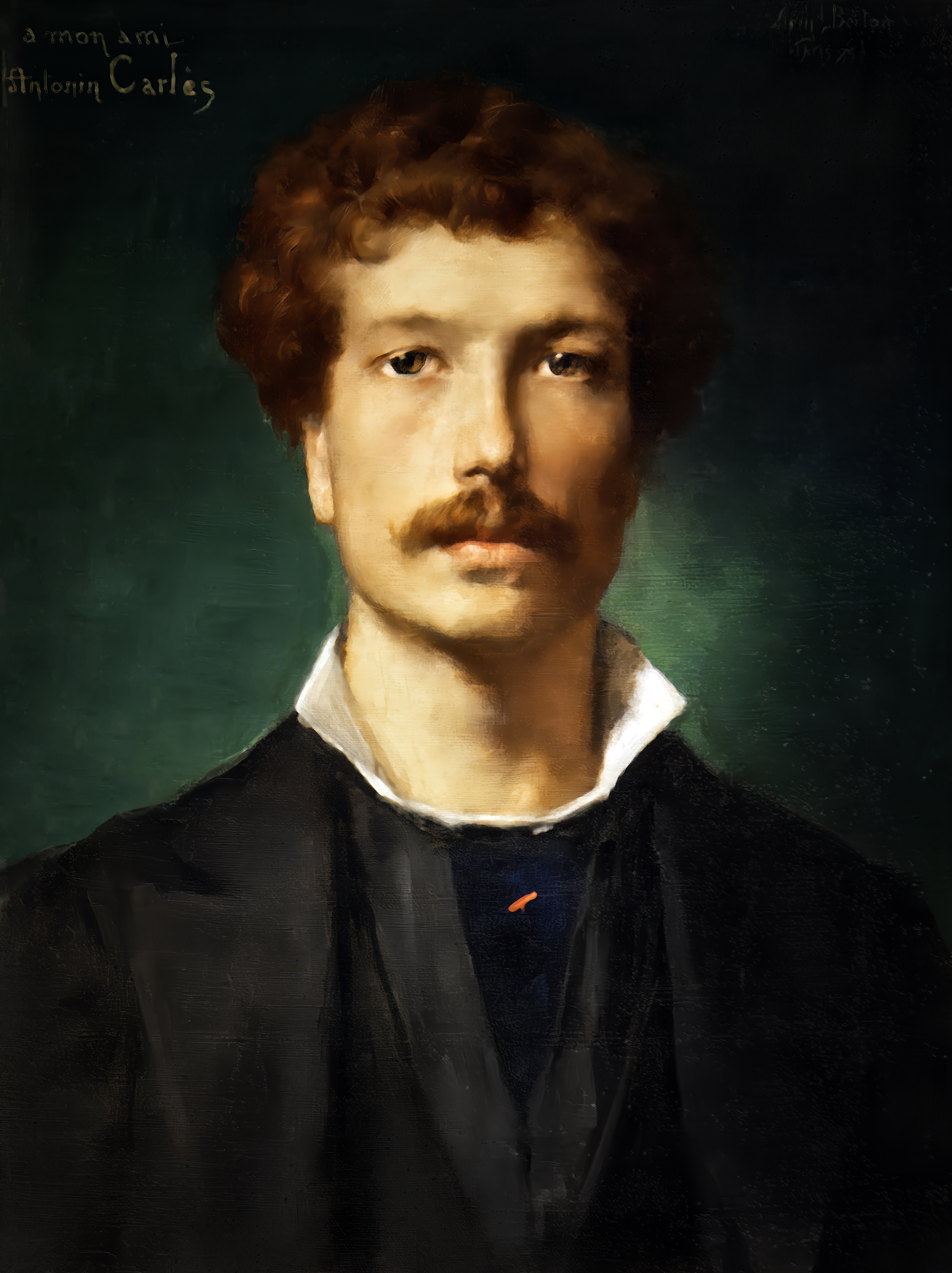
Antonin Carlès' portrait, by Armand Berton

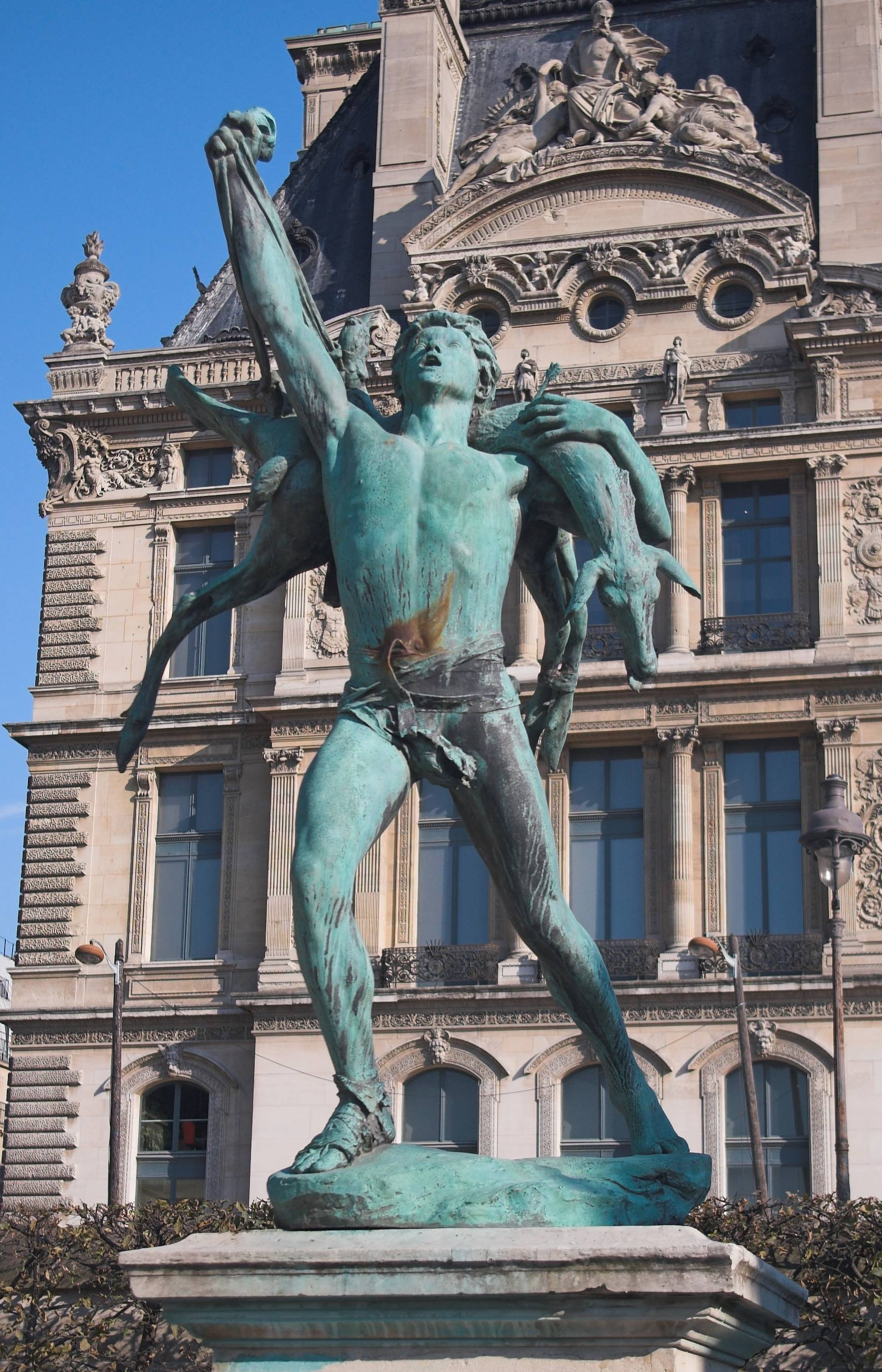
Retour de chasse, by Antonin Carlès, 1888, Jardin des Tuileries

Born in Gimont, Carlès began his studies in Marseille and then successively to the École des Beaux-Arts de Toulouse and that of Paris. He was a pupil of François Jouffroy (1806–1882) and Ernest-Eugène Hiolle (1834–1886), he won the Grand Prix de l'Exposition Universelle in 1889. He belonged to the Society of French Artists. Several models of his sculptures (La Jeunesse, Retour de chasse) are kept at the Musée des Jacobins d'Auch (Gers). He died in Paris.

== Main works ==
- La Cigale, plaster, Salon de 1878, Musée de Lectoure (Gers).
- Le Mendiant, plaster, Salon de 1879, Musée des Jacobins d'Auch (Gers).
- Charles VII, stone, 1879, facade of the city hall of Compiègne (Oise).
- Abel, plaster, Musée des Beaux-Arts d'Angers.
- Abel, marble, Musée d'Orsay.
- La Jeunesse, plaster, Musée Camille Claudel, Nogent-sur-Seine.
- La Jeunesse, marble, 1885, Musée d'Orsay (Paris).
- Retour de Chasse, bronze, awarded at the Exposition Universelle of 1889, Jardin des Tuileries (Allée de Diane) in Paris.
- Hommage à Pierre Goudouli, Salle des Illustres at the Capitole de Toulouse.
- Au Champ d'Honneur, stone, 1894, Château de La Boissière-École.
- Sépulture d'Henri Cernuschi, stone, 1896, Cimetière du Père-Lachaise (Section 66).
- Etude, bust, marble, exposed at the Salon de la Société des Artistes Français of 1898.
- Paul Kruger, plaster of Paris, 1902, Ditsong Kruger House, Pretoria.
- Bacchus, bronze, 1903, Musée des Beaux-Arts de Dijon.
- Monument au Commandant Olympe Hériot, marble, 1906, Ecole Hériot, La Boissière-École.
- Portrait de Mlle Simone, marble, exposed at the Salon des Artistes Français of 1907.
- Bust of Armand Fallières, marble, 1908, Palais de l'Élysée.
- Le Lot-et-Garonne à ses enfants illustres; les Lauriers, bronze, 1912, Agen.
- Monuments aux enfants Schneider, bronze, 1913, Le Creusot (Bourgogne).
- Max Barthou - Fils de Léon Barthou, marble, 1913, Musée d'Orsay (Paris).
- Buste d'adolescent, marble, 1913, Musée du Luxembourg (Paris).
- Patrie, marble, exposed at the Salon des Artistes Français de 1914.
- Monument for Louis Pasteur, bronze, Dôle.
- Buste d'Henri Cernuschi, marbel, Musée Alsacien (Strasbourg).
