= Villa Cypris =

Villa in Roquebrune-Cap-Martin, France

Coordinates: 43°45′6″N 7°28′40″E

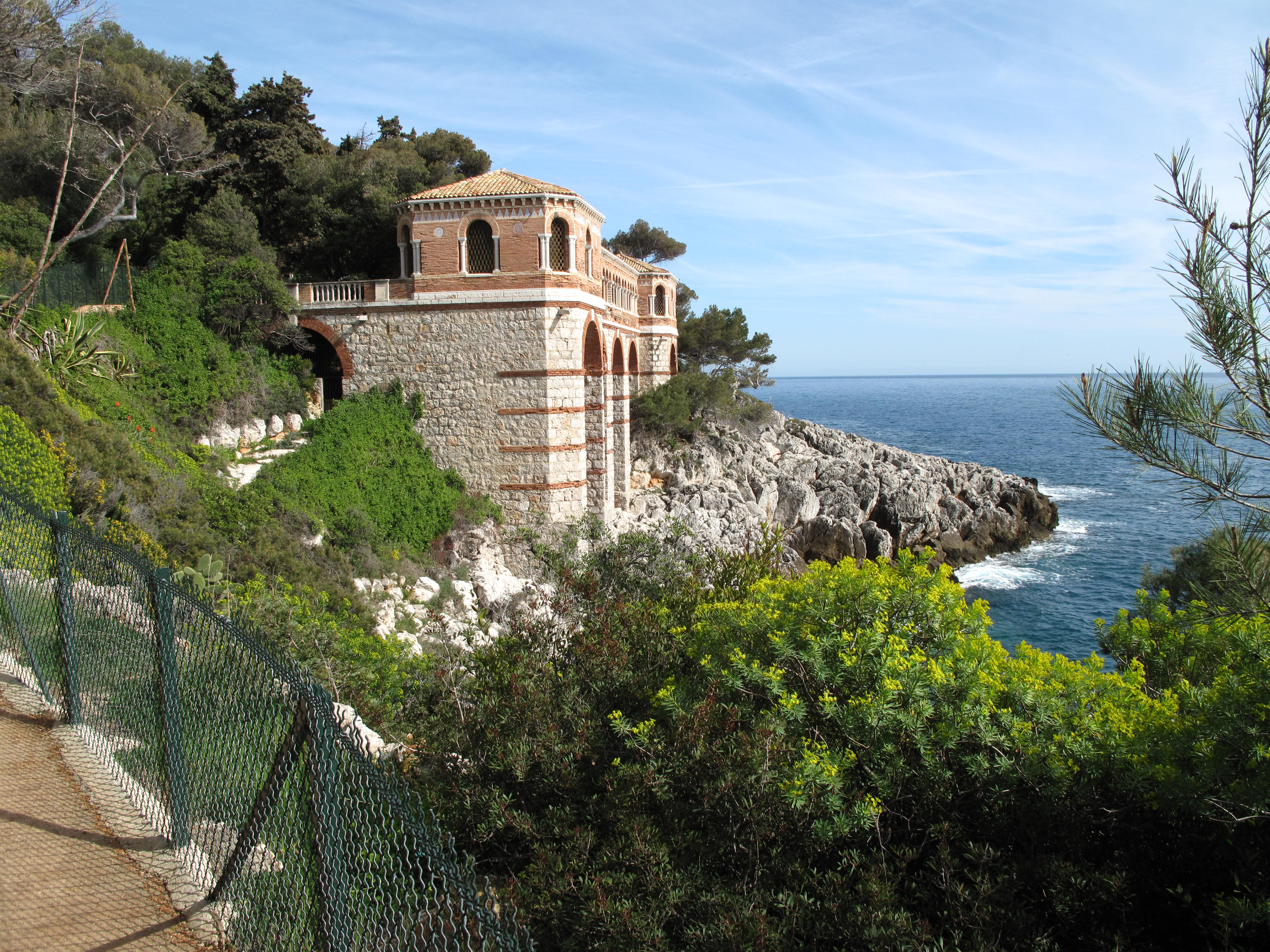
The gallery overlooking the sea

Villa Cypris is a seaside villa in Roquebrune-Cap-Martin on the French Riviera.

The villa was built c. 1904 in Neo-Byzantine style by architect Edouard Arnaud for Cyprienne Dubernet, the widow of Grands Magasins du Louvre's proprietor Olympe Hériot. It is adjacent to Villa Cyrnos.

The gardens, laid out in 1909, slope steeply down to the sea. Designs for the gardens, as well as the villa interiors, were provided by Italian painter Raffaele Mainella, who did likewise for Villa Torre Clementina, also in Roquebrune-Cap-Martin. He built a cloister gallery overlooking the sea, linked to the villa by a bridge and a long flight of turfed steps lined with columns. This central stairway is flanked by two more, parallel stairways. Other garden features include a Venetian-style loggia, a pergola with columns and arches styled after the Mosque–Cathedral of Córdoba, and a sunken Dutch garden containing a long canal.

The gallery and other features provided viewpoints for Dubernet to watch her daughter Virginie Hériot, a competitive sailor, yachting in the bay below.

The villa, together with its gardens, was registered as a monument historique in 1990. It is not open to the public.
