= Gath =

Gath can refer to:

- Gath (surname)
- Gath (city), the biblical city and home of Goliath. Main site is Gath of the Philistines, but there are also other locations Gath Gittaim and Gath Carmel
- Gath-hepher, a border town in ancient Israel
- Gath (magazine), the successor to Gairm, the most significant Scottish Gaelic magazine for its longevity and range
- Gath & Chaves, an Argentine luxury department store
- The pen name of journalist George Alfred Townsend
- G.A.T.H is the acronym for the American band Gregory and the Hawk
- A fictional nation-state in the TV series Kings, based on the biblical city
- GATH is an abbreviation for the "Georgia Theatre" in Athens, Georgia, a mid-size concert venue near the University of Georgia campus where many famous acts have played.
