= Alphonse Monchablon =

French painter

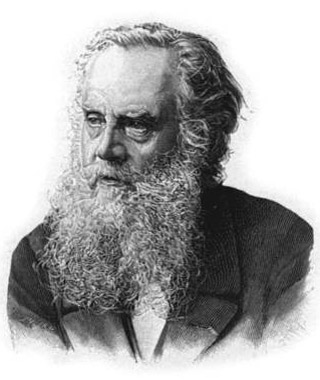
Monchablon by an unknown artist (c.1900)

Xavier-Alphonse Monchablon (12 June 1835, in Avillers – 30 January 1907, in Paris) was a French history and portrait painter in the Academic style. He was distantly related to the more popular painter, Jan Monchablon.

== Biography ==
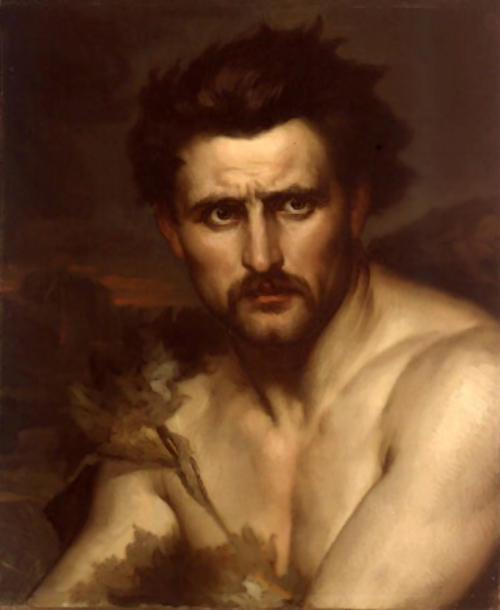
Terror (Portrait of Cain)

His father was a teacher and amateur artist, who gave him some of his first lessons. He was also apprenticed to a lithographer in Mirecourt. In 1856, he enrolled at the École des Beaux-arts, where he studied with Sébastien-Melchior Cornu and Charles Gleyre. He achieved second-place in the Prix de Rome in 1862 and, the following year, tied for first-place with his painting of Joseph being recognized by his brothers.

He had his début at the Salon in 1866. Throughout his life, he exhibited widely and was awarded several medals, including a gold medal at the Exposition Universelle (1900). He also created numerous religious frescoes; notably those in the crypt at the "Basilique du Bois Chênu" of Domrémy-la-Pucelle, the seminary in Angers and the Eudist chapel at Versailles.

In addition, he executed a mural called the "Glories of Lorraine" for the amphitheater of the Faculty of Letters at the University of Lorraine in Nancy. This was done in response to the German annexation of most of Alsace-Lorraine in 1871.

Among his best-known portraits are those of Prime Minister Louis Buffet, the explorer Pierre Savorgnan de Brazza and the sculptor Ernest-Eugène Hiolle. He is also known for a widely distributed engraving of Victor Hugo.

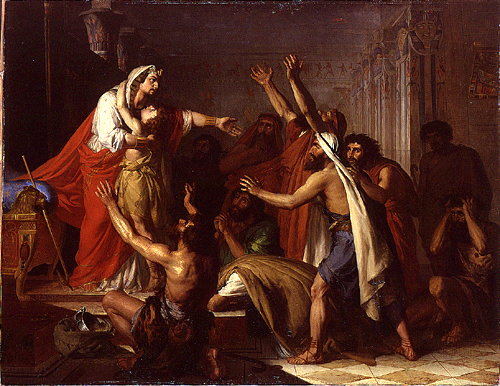
Joseph Being Recognized by his Brothers.

He became a Knight of the Légion d'Honneur in 1897. His son, Édouard Monchablon, won the Prix de Rome for painting in 1903. His sister was married to the painter William Bouguereau. His daughter, Gabrielle, married the flautist Louis Fleury and was a moderately successful concert pianist.
