= Virginie Hériot =

French sailor

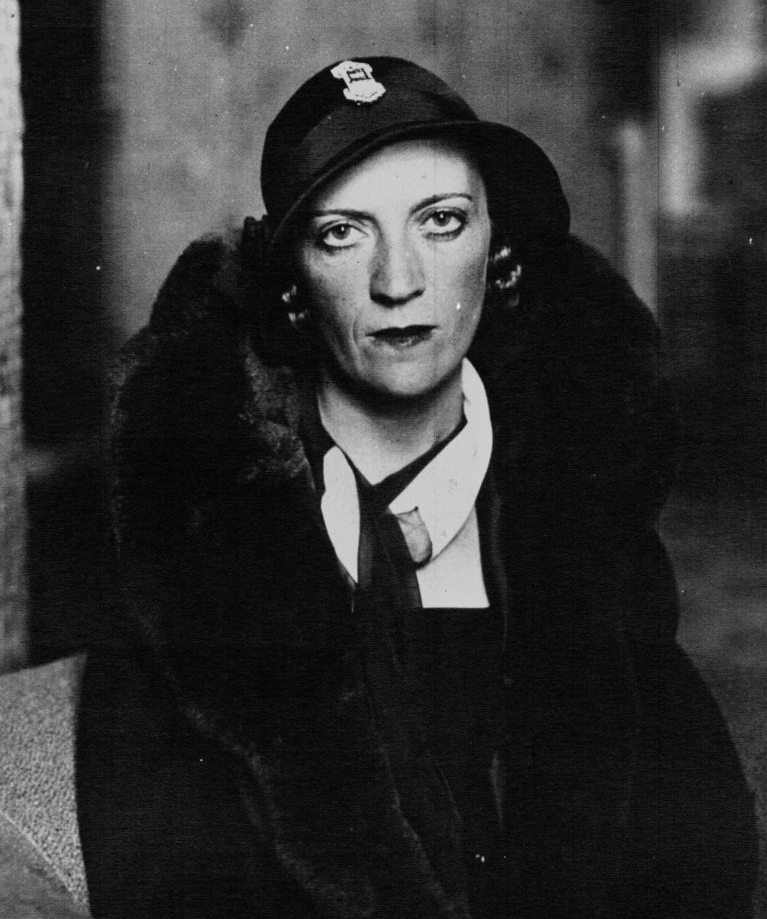
- Hériot in 1931

Personal information
- Born: 26 July 1890 Le Vésinet, France
- Died: 28 August 1932 (aged 42) Arcachon, France

Sport
- Sport: Sailing
- Club: Cercle de la Voile d'Arcachon
Medal record
Representing France
Olympic Games
Gold medal – first place	1928 Amsterdam	8 metre class

Virginie Claire Désirée Marie Hériot (French: [viʁʒini eʁjo]; 26 July 1890 – 28 August 1932) was a French yachtswoman who won in the 1928 Summer Olympics in the 8 Metre Aile VI.

== Biography ==
Daughter of Grands Magasins du Louvre's owner Olympe Hériot and Cyprienne Dubernet, Hériot first cruised in 1904 aboard her mother's yacht Katoomba (rechristened El Salvador in 1904), with her brother Auguste and seven friends of the family. Her Mediterranean tour from April to June of that year would have a deep impact on her life.

On 2 May 1910, at the Château de La Boissière (Yvelines), she was married to Viscount François Marie Haincque de Saint Senoch, also impassioned by the sea. The yacht El Salvadaor was given to the couple as a wedding present and they spent their honeymoon aboard. They begot a son, Hubert, born on 5 January 1913. In 1918, Hériot underwent a serious surgical operation, and in June 1921 she and her husband separated. She became fully dedicated to yachting after this, seldom staying at her Parisian apartment in rue de Presbourg.

In 1912, Hériot ordered her first racer: L' Aile I, but failed reconquer the Coupe of France that the English had held for two years. In 1921, she acquired the 85-metre 1492-ton steamyacht Finlandia, which she later replaced with the 45-metre 400-ton auxiliary schooner L' Ailée, where she would spend 10 months per year.

Hériot ordered more racers: the 8 Metre L' Aile II and the 6 Metre Petite Aile. In 1922 L' Aile II was first beaten by Bora in Le Havre, but with perseverance Hériot soon won race after race. In 1928, she won the gold medal at the Amsterdam Olympic Games aboard Aile VI, as well as the "Cup of Italy" against Holland, Italy, England, the United States, Sweden, Norway and Argentina. In 1929, she lifted the "Coupe of France" from the English and won "His Majesty Alfonso XIII of Spain Copa del Rey". In 1931, she won the Ryde-Le Havre-Ryde race with a lead of 9 minutes and 40 seconds on the three-masted schooner Sonia.

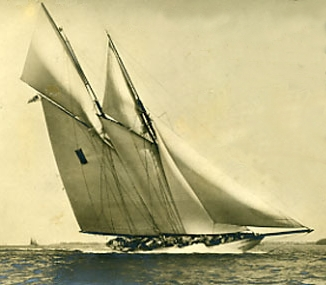
Schooner "L'Ailée", formerly "Meteor VI".

Following these victories, Hériot was awarded the Knighthood of the Légion d'honneur. Alfonso XIII of Spain made visits with his family on her schooner Ailée II and awarded her the Spanish Naval Merit in 1930. The poet Rabindranath Tagore called her "Madame de la Mer".

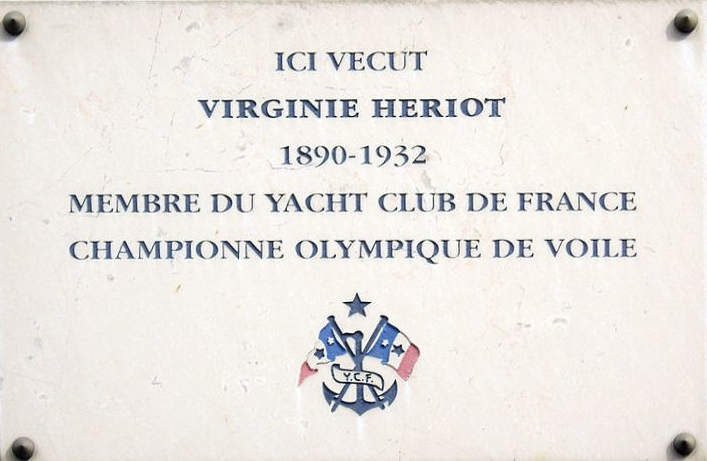
Plate affixed at Hériot's Parisian residence.

Hériot promoted French yachting and French shipyard engineering throughout the world. According to Georges Leygues, she had become a true "ambassadress of the French Navy". She was also devoted to philanthropic works, supported clubs such as the Yacht Club de France which was chaired by Jean-Baptiste Charcot at the time, and offered Brest one-designs to the pupils of the École Navale. She published poems, as well as a "Harbour atlas" with her own drawings.

In early 1932, she was seriously injured in a storm between Venice and Greece, but refused to retire from the competition. At the end of August, during the Arcachon regattas, she lost consciousness aboard Aile VII, but started nevertheless. Struck by a syncope as she crossed the finishing line, she later died on 28 August 1932, aboard Ailée II. Her funeral was held on 2 September in Paris in the Saint Clotilde Basilica. Her mother, unable to order Virginie's body to be cast off the Breton coasts as per her dying wishes, had her buried in the family vault in La Boissière-École instead. In 1948, her son honoured Virginie's wishes, and her body was finally cast to the sea.

== Coupe Virginie Hériot ==
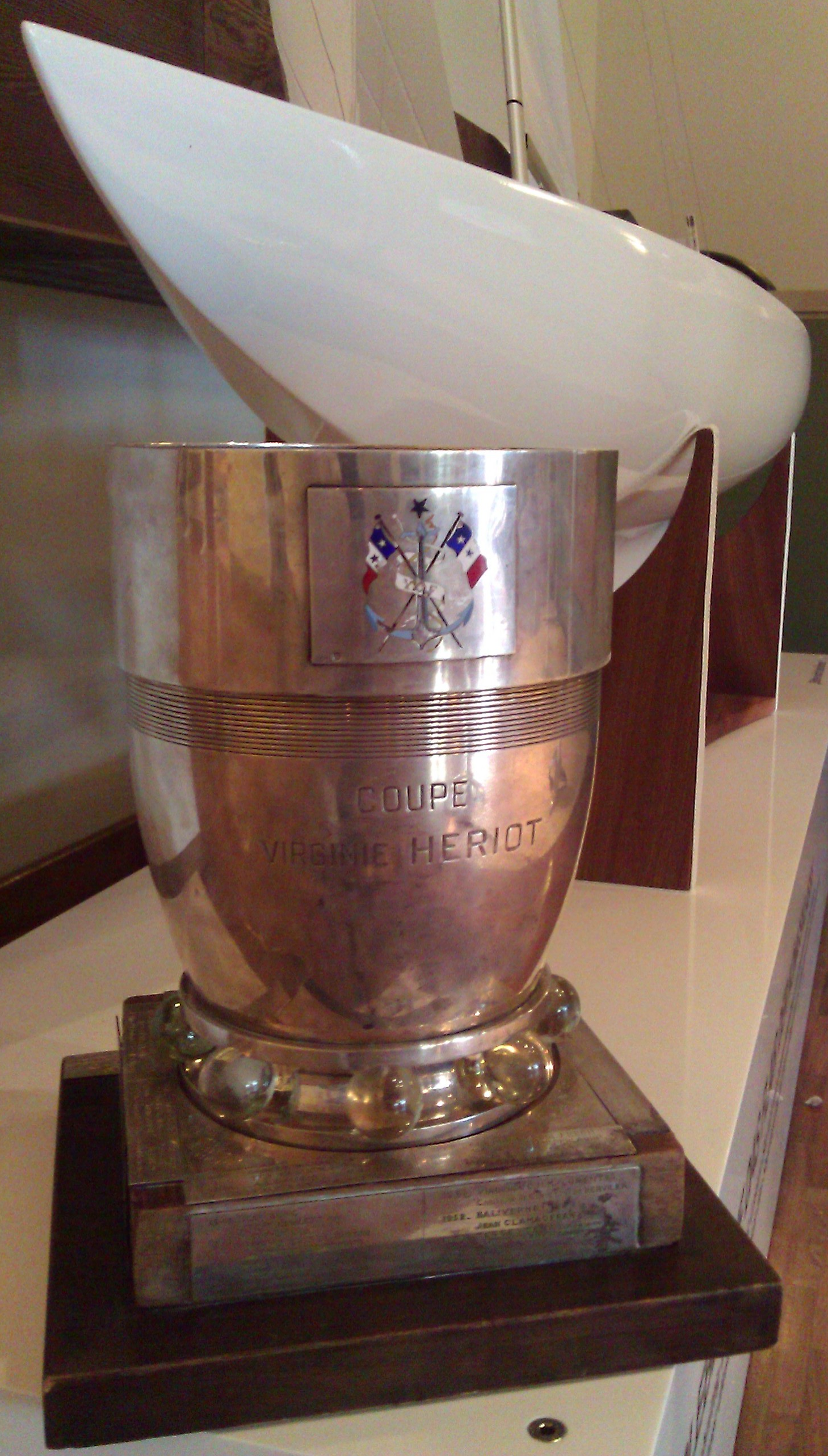
Coupe Virginie Hériot

In memory of Hériot and in accordance with her often expressed wish to encourage yachting, the Committee of the Yacht Club de France decided at a meeting on 21 May 1946 to initiate an International Cup and name it the "Coupe Virginie Hériot". The Cup is assigned to the International Dragon Class, but remains the property of the Yacht Club de France. In agreement with the Committee of the International Dragon Association the "Coupe Virginie Hériot" is the main trophy of the European Dragon Championship. The event is now held annually.

== Prizes awarded ==
1924 : Aile III – Copa del Rey SM Alphonse XIII
1925 : Aile IV – Coupe Rylard, Coupe de la Méditerranée, Coupe Cumberland, France Champion
1925 : Aile V – Coupe de Copenhague, Coupe Porte, Coupe des Etrangers
1927 : Petite Aile II – Coupe du Cercle de la Voile de Paris, « One Ton Cup »
1928 : Aile VI – World Champion, Olympic Gold Medalist, Coupe d'Italie, Coupe Rylard
1928 : Petite Aile II – Prix d'Honneur, Coupe Clerc-RampaI, Prix d'Honneur, Meilleur Classement, Copa del Rey Spain
1929 : Aile VI – Coupe de France, Coupe d'Or de SM Alphonse XIII
1930 : Aile VI – Coupe Macomber, Coupe Thalassa

== Books ==
L'Aile I
Quart de Nuit
À bord du Finlandia
La Seconde France (Impressions sur les fêtes du Centenaire), 1931
Sur mer : impression et souvenirs, 1933
Le Vaisseau Ailée, le bateau qui a des ailes, 1931
Ailée s'en va, 1923–1927
Service à la mer, 1932

== Poems ==
Goélette ailée, poèmes, 1927
Le Bateau de mon enfance, poèmes, 1928
Une âme à la mer, 1931, couronné par l'Académie française
