= Cyprienne Dubernet =

French philanthropist

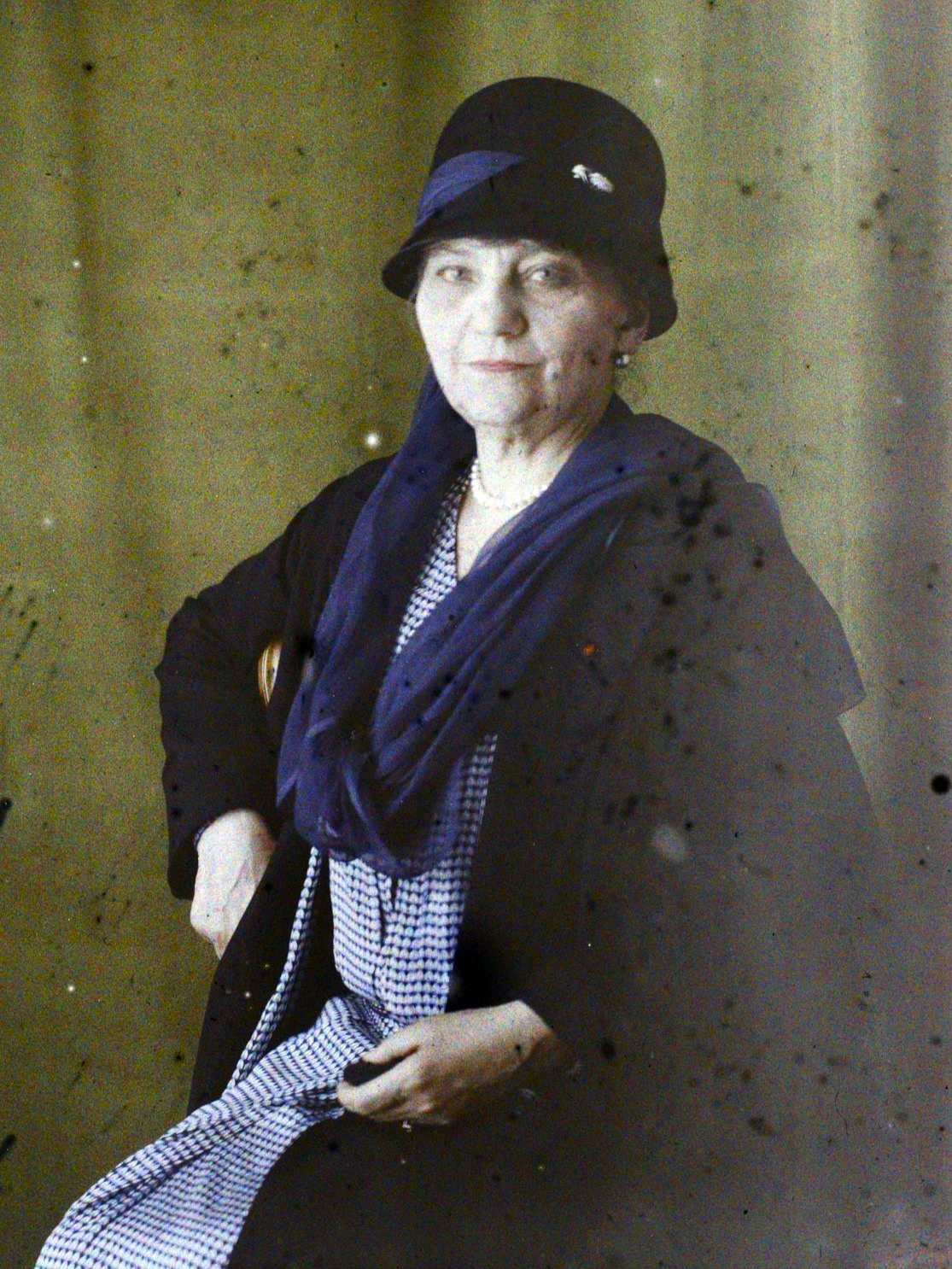
Autochrome portrait by Auguste Léon, 1927

Anne Marie Dubernet known as Cyprienne Dubernet, Madame Olympe Hériot and later Madame Roger Douine (1857 – 5 December 1945), was a French patron of the arts and philanthropist, who was made a Chevalier de la Légion d'Honneur.

== Biography ==
Daughter of a wool-spinner, Anne Marie Dubernet came from a modest family in Lot-et-Garonne. She sold corsets at the Grands Magasins du Louvre and on 24 August 1887 married the director-proprietor, Olympe Hériot (1833–1899), to whom she had already borne two children. They had four children in total, including Virginie Hériot, who became a competitive sailor.

In 1894 they moved to a mansion in Paris. Widowed in 1899, Anne Marie inherited her husband's fortune in accordance with his will. In 1903 she redeveloped a site of 1,700 square metres (18,000 sq ft) on the Rue de la Faisanderie in Paris, commissioning architect Hans-Georg Tersling to build a mansion, which she sold in 1928.

In 1904 she bought a yacht, Ketoomba, which she renamed Salvador. She wrote a memoir of her voyages (Croisière en Méditerranée (Coulommiers, P. Brodard, 1905, 298 pages, in-8)). Around 1904, she commissioned architect Edouard Arnaud to build the Villa Cypris in Roquebrune-Cap-Martin on the French Riviera.

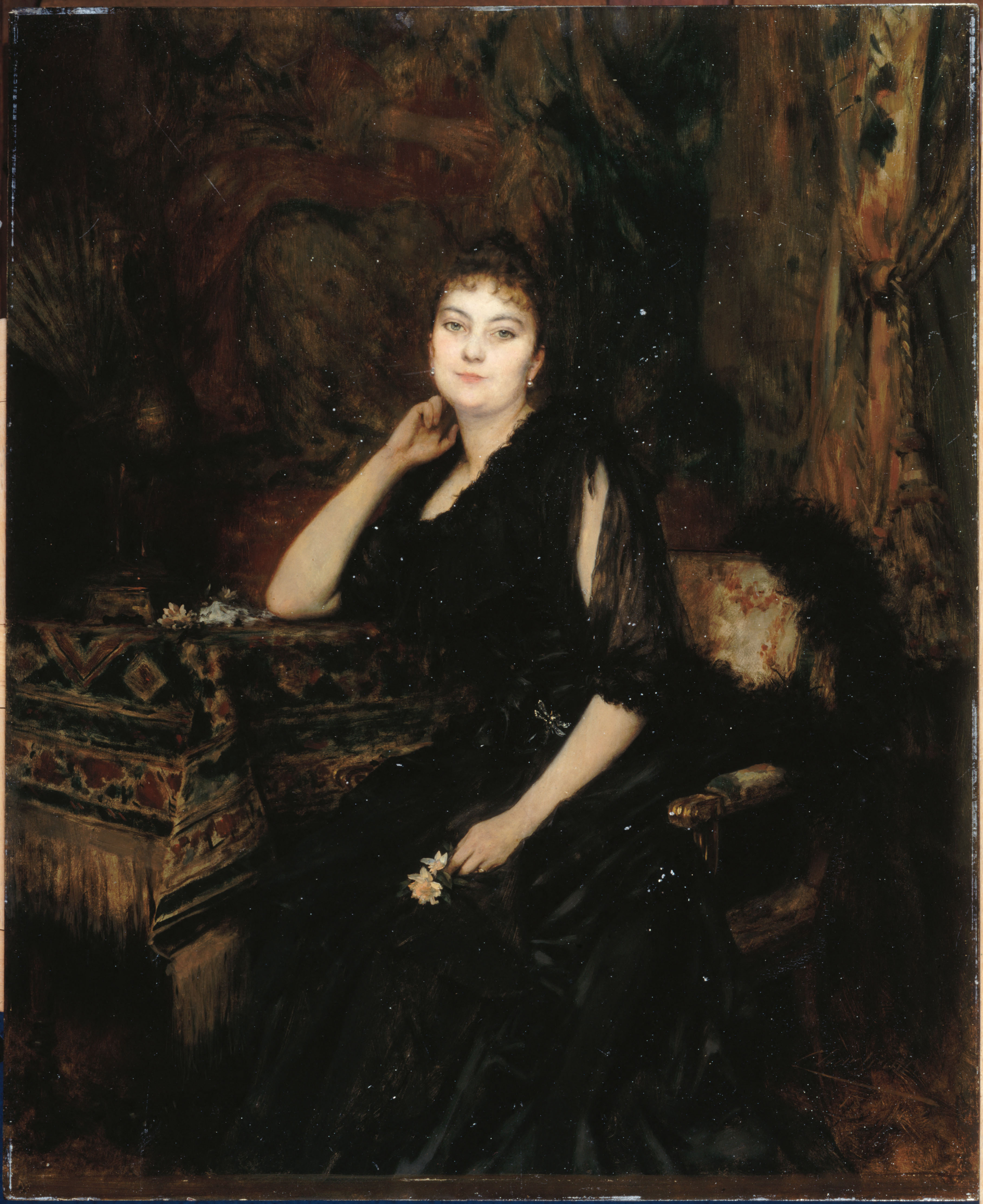
Cyprienne Dubernet.

On 16 December 1908 she remarried to Roger Douine Hippolytus (died 1925).

During the First World War, she turned her château in Essoyes into a hospital. She sold this in 1929. In 1917 she donated 1.5 million francs to enlarge an orphanage founded in 1884 by her first husband in the grounds of his Château de La Boissière in La Boissière-École. In 1920 she donated to the orphanage the Castel de Barbe-Brulée near Cancale to serve as a holiday home.

Thanks to her generosity she was made a Chevalier de la Légion d'Honneur on 5 June 1921 by the order of Marshal Philippe Pétain.

She was buried in the family vault in La Boissière-École.

== Sources ==
Translator's note: These are in French.

- Bernard Pharisien, L'Exceptionnelle famille Hériot, Le Mée-sur-Seine, Imprimerie Némont, 2001 (ISBN 2-913163-04-1)
- Gérard Rousset-Charny, Les Palais parisiens de la Belle Époque, Paris, Délégation à l'action artistique de la Ville de Paris, 1990, pp. 170 sqq.
