= Hotel Metropole, Monte Carlo =

Hotel in Monte Carlo, Monaco

Coordinates: 43.740935°N 7.427934°E

Hotel Metropole Monte Carlo
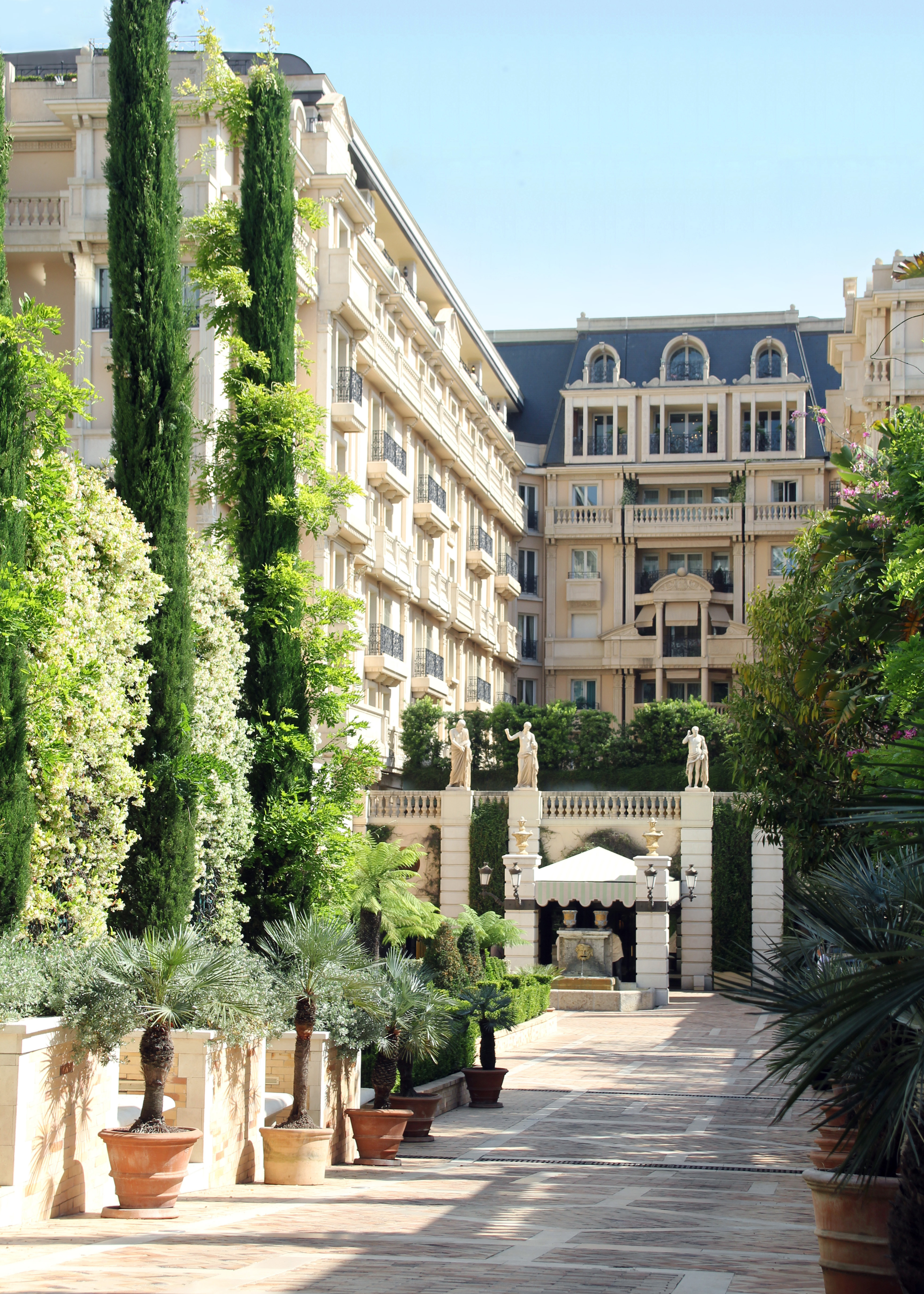
- The current Hotel Metropole building
- Interactive map of the Hotel Metropole Monte Carlo area

General information
- Type: Luxury hotel
- Location: Monte Carlo, Monaco, 4 Avenue de la Madone
- Opened: 1889; 137 years ago
- Affiliation: The Leading Hotels of the World

Design and construction
- Architect: Hans-Georg Tersling

Other information
- Number of rooms: 62
- Number of suites: 64
- Number of restaurants: 3

Website
- metropole.com/en

The Hotel Metropole Monte Carlo (French: Hôtel Métropole Monte-Carlo) is a five-star luxury hotel at 4 Avenue de la Madone in Monte Carlo, Monaco.

== History ==
The Hotel Metropole was built in 1889, designed by Hans-Georg Tersling. Prince Andrew of Greece and Denmark died there in 1944. Italian American television host Mike Bongiorno died there in 2009.

Lebanese developer Nabil Boustany bought the hotel from the British Grand Metropolitan group in 1980. Boustany spent $140 million gutting and rebuilding the aging hotel into a modern luxury hotel. The hotel reopened in 1988 as Le Metropole Palace. The opening was attended by Prince Rainier, Prince Albert, and Princess Stephanie. The hotel was operated by Conrad Hotels, the international division of Hilton Hotels. In September 2003, it closed for a major renovation, reopening in July 2004 with its name shortened to Hotel Metropole Monte Carlo to match the original hotel. It has 126 guest rooms, including 64 suites.

In November 2020, the hotel closed for the first phase of renovation; it took five months and the hotel reopened in April 2021.

== Gallery ==
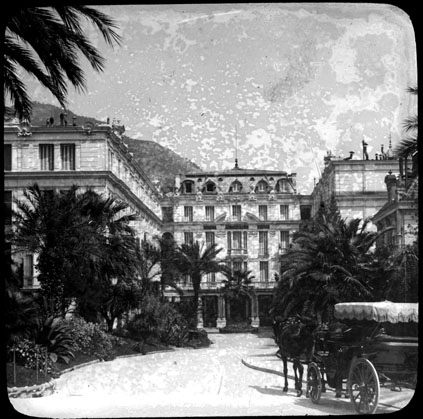
The original Hotel Metropole building

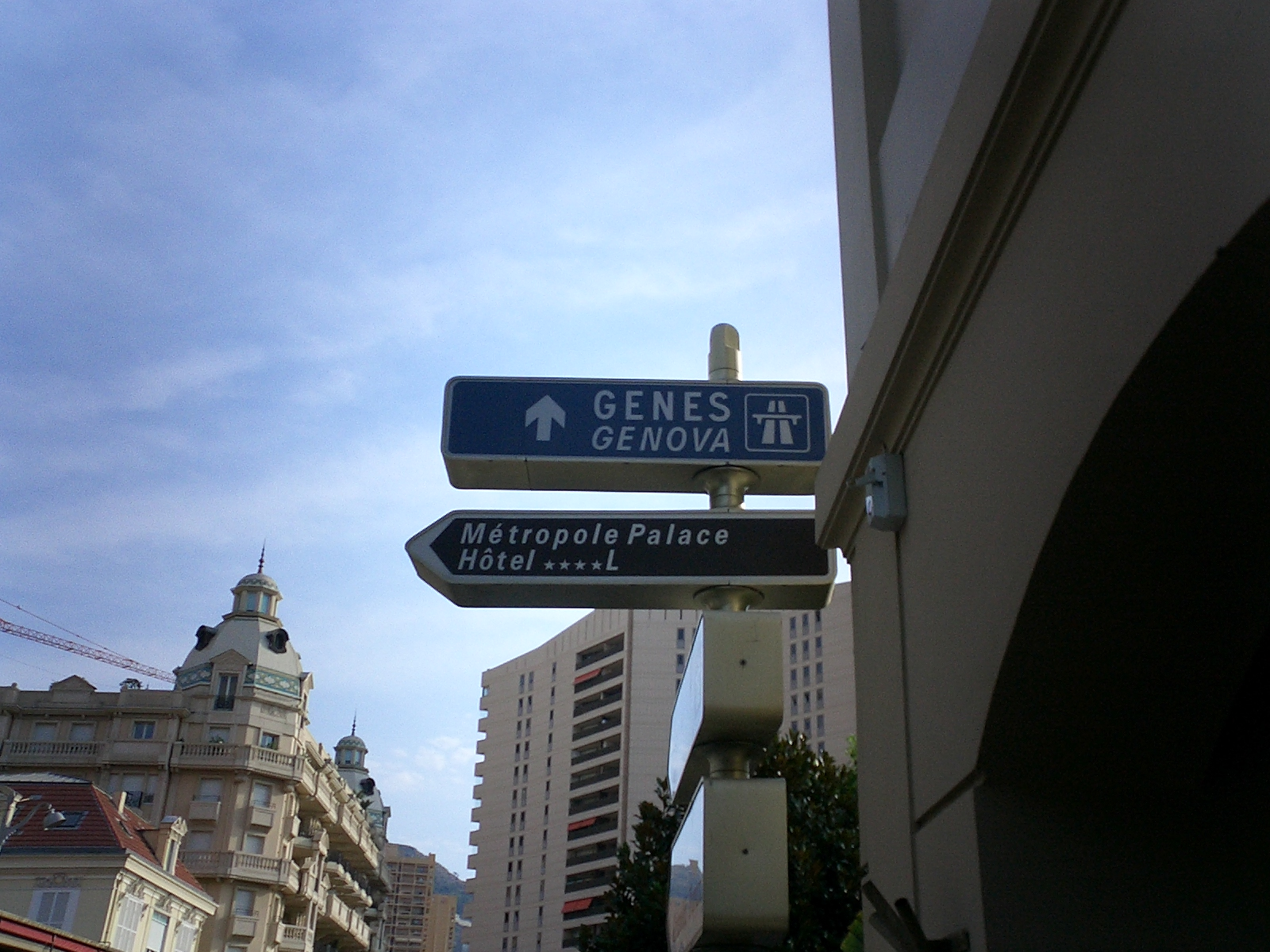
Turrets of the current Hotel Metropole (far left)
