= Hans-Georg Tersling =

Danish architect

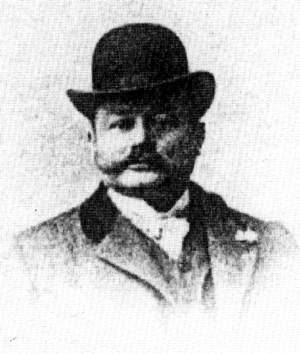
- Kaj Gottlob
- Born: 7 December 1857; Karlebo, Denmark
- Died: 12 November 1920 (aged 62); Menton, France
- Education: Royal Danish Academy of Fine Arts
- Occupation: Architect

Hans-Georg Tersling (7 December 1857 – 13 November 1920) was a Danish architect who lived and worked for most of his life on the French Riviera where he became one of the most significant and productive architects of the Belle Époque. His work mainly consisted of designing mondain hotels, villas and mansions for members of the French and European aristocracy and other elite who resided in the area.

His style was the Neoclassical Louis XVI style and he drew on inspiration from the Italian Renaissance.

== Early life and education ==
Hans-Georg Tersling was born on a farm outside the small town of Karlebo north of Copenhagen, Denmark. His parents were Carl Gustav Tersling (1814–60) and Caroline Marie Elisabeth Hall (1825–88). His father died when he was three. He trained as a carpenter before attending the architecture school of the Royal Danish Academy of Fine Arts, receiving his diploma in 1879.

== Career ==
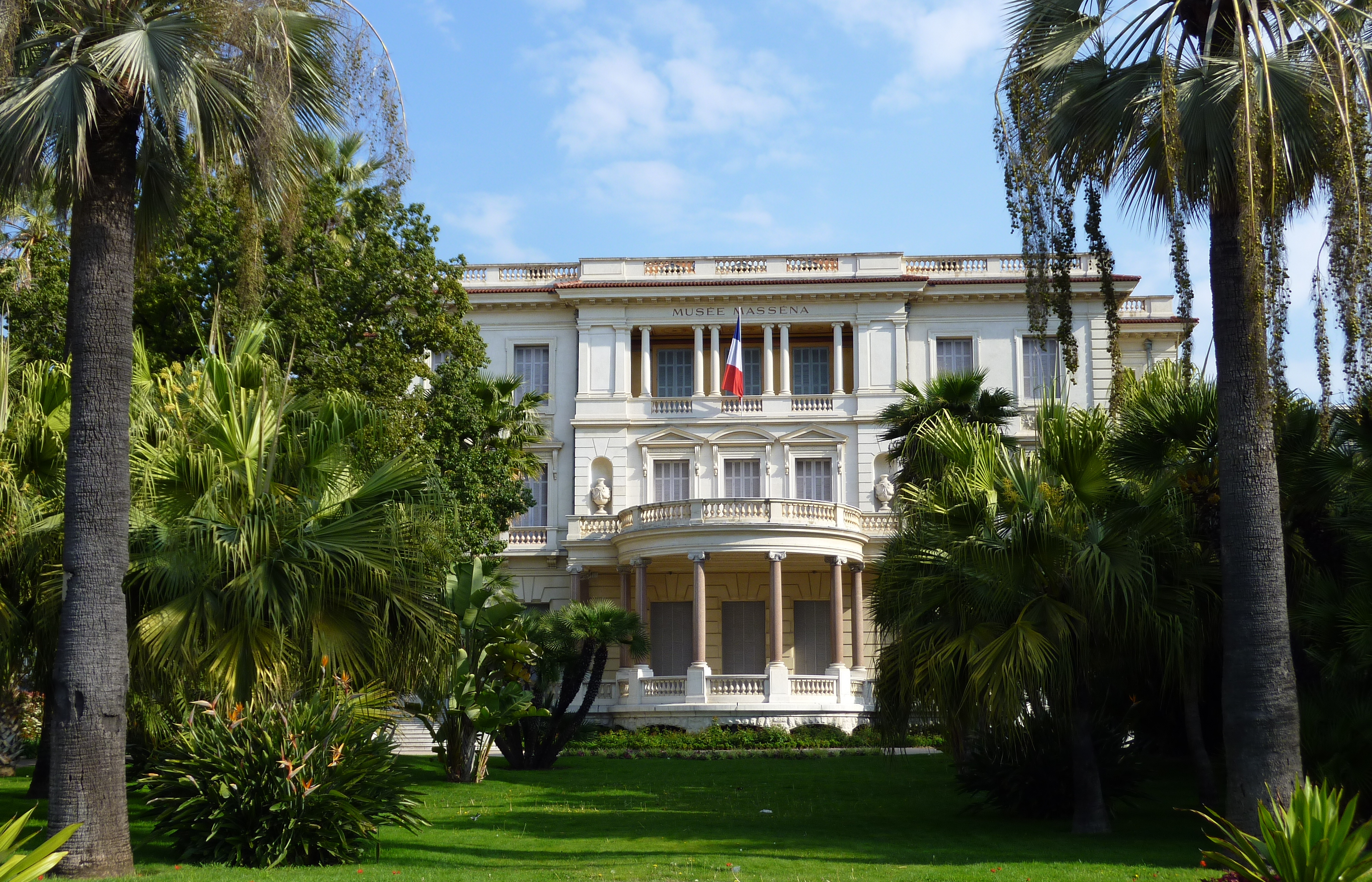
The Villa Masséna in Nice, now the Musée Masséna

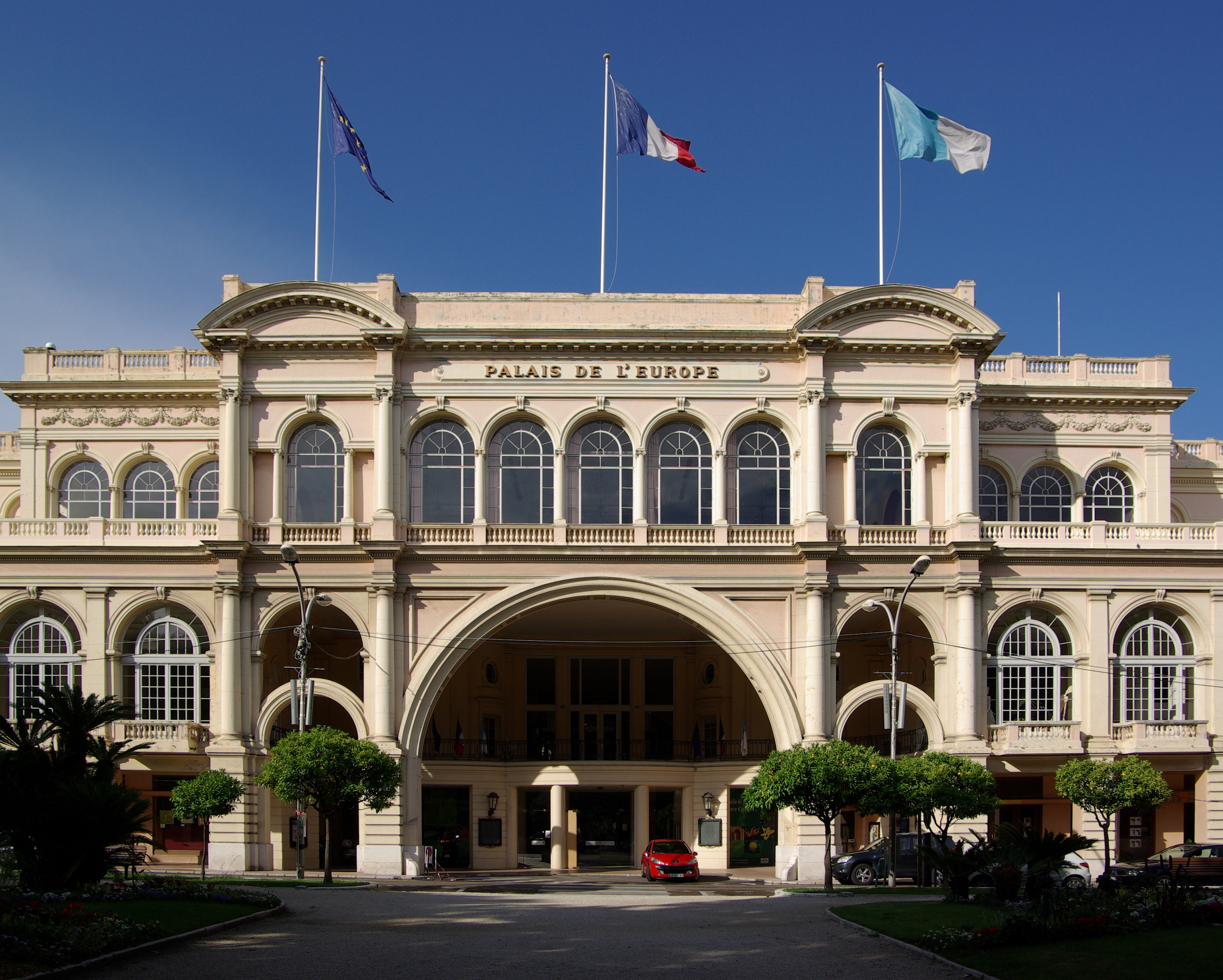
Menton's former casino from 1909, now thePalais de l’Europe

After his graduation, Tersling travelled to France where he was employed by Charles Garnier to work on the Monte Carlo Casino where he completed the Salle Schemitt. After this assignment he lived for a while in Paris before ultimately settling in Menton in the south of France.

At Cape Martin between Menton and Nice, he was commissioned by a consortium headed by the Mr White of Black & White whisky, to design the Grand Hotel. The hotel was an instant international success with the emperor Franz Joseph I of Austria staying at the hotel four times between 1896 and 1897.

Mr White also engaged Tersling to build three stately villas in the surroundings. The first of these, Villa Cyrnos, completed in 1892, was built for Eugénie de Montijo, the last Empress consort of the French. The second was for his own use and the third, Les Rochers, was for his close friend Mr Blake in 1908.

The villa he designed for Eugénie de Montijo impressed the Russian Empress Consort who commissioned him to build a Russian Orthodox church in Menton for the Russian colony on the coast.

Among his other clients were Elisabeth of Bavaria and the French politician Victor Masséna whose villa in Nice today serves as the municipal Musée Masséna.

In 1905, Tersling won an architectural competition for the design of the Hotel Hériot in Paris.

Back in Menton, he designed the town's casino which was completed in 1909. It now houses the Galerie d’Art du Palais de l’Europe, a contemporary arts museum.

With the outbreak of World War I, Tersling's career came to a sudden end. His many wealthy clients disappeared and left him with many outstanding receivables. He died in 1920 almost without means.

== Personal life ==
In 1890, Tersling married Félicie Marie Francoise Sabatier (1856- -1937). She was the daughter of Henri Auguste Sabatier and Elisabeth Gibert.

In 1910, he was created a Knight of the Order of the Dannebrog.

== Selected works ==
- Hotel Metropole, Monte Carlo (1888)
- Grand hôtel du cap Martin (1890)
- Villa Cyrnos, Cynthia, Roquebrune-Cap-Martin (1892 )
- Villa Artheruse, Cape Martin (1893)
- Villa Hermitage-Malet, Cap-d'Ail (1895)
- Palais Carnoles, Menton (1896)
- Hôtel Bristol, Beaulieu-sur-Mer (1898)
- Villa Masséna, Nice (1899)
- Hôtel du golf, Sospel et l'église russe, Menton (1900)
- Villa La loggia, Villefranche-sur-Mer (1900)
- Villa Lairolle, Nice (1904)
- Les Rochers, Cap Martin, France
- Hôtel Heriot, Paris (1905)
- Palais Viale, Menton (1906)
- Palais de l’Europe (current name), Menton (1908)
- Contribution à l’église du Sacré-Cœur, Menton (1911)
- Hôtel Impérial, Menton (1913)

== Bibliography ==
- Steve, Michel: Hans-Georg Tersling, architecte de la Côte d'Azur.1990. ISBN 2-86410-144-0. (France)

== See also ==
- Concours de façades de la ville de Paris of which he was one of the winners in 1905
