= Gath (surname) =

Gath is a surname that may refer to

- Alfredo Gath (1852–1936), Argentine businessman, co-founder of Gath & Chaves
- Conor Gath (born 1980), Irish hurler
- Kulan Gath, fictional character in Marvel Comics
- Mikael Gath (born 1976), Swedish ice hockey player
- Yoav Gath (born 1980), Israeli Olympic swimmer
- The pen name of journalist George Alfred Townsend
