= Villa Cyrnos =

Villa in Roquebrune-Cap-Martin, France

Coordinates: 43°45′09″N 7°28′34″E

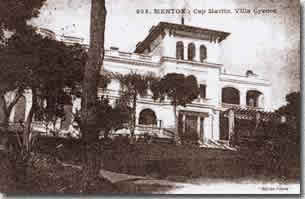
The house photographed in 1912

Villa Cyrnos is a Belle Époque-style villa in Roquebrune-Cap-Martin on the Côte d'Azur in Southern France.

== History ==
The villa, named after the ancient Greek for Corsica, was designed by Hans-Georg Tersling and built in 1892 for Eugénie de Montijo, wife of Napoleon III, Emperor of the French and the last Empress consort of the French.

Elisabeth, Empress of Austria, became a regular guest at the villa. Queen Victoria was another of Eugénie's friends and visited the villa annually.

In 1920, the villa was inherited by Marie-Laetitia Bonaparte who, during her widowhood, maintained a scandalous relationship with Norberto Fischer, a military man twenty years her junior. As the sole heir in her will, he inherited the house in 1926 and lived there—since his 1928 marriage, with opera singer Vina Bovy—until his death in 1950. In 1960 Bovy sold the house.

== Villa Cypris ==
It is adjacent to Villa Cypris.
