= Prince Bernhard of Saxe-Weimar-Eisenach =

Prince Bernhard of Saxe-Weimar-Eisenach may refer to:

- Prince Bernhard of Saxe-Weimar-Eisenach (1792–1862), Prince Carl Bernhard, son of Charles Augustus, Grand Duke of Saxe-Weimar-Eisenach and husband of Princess Ida of Saxe-Meiningen.
- Prince Bernhard of Saxe-Weimar-Eisenach (1878–1900), son of Charles Augustus, Hereditary Grand Duke of Saxe-Weimar-Eisenach (1844–1894) and potential suitor of Queen Wilhelmina of the Netherlands.
- Prince Bernhard of Saxe-Weimar-Eisenach (1917–1986), Bernhard Friedrich Viktor, son of William Ernest, Grand Duke of Saxe-Weimar-Eisenach
