= Ernest-Eugène Hiolle =

French sculptor

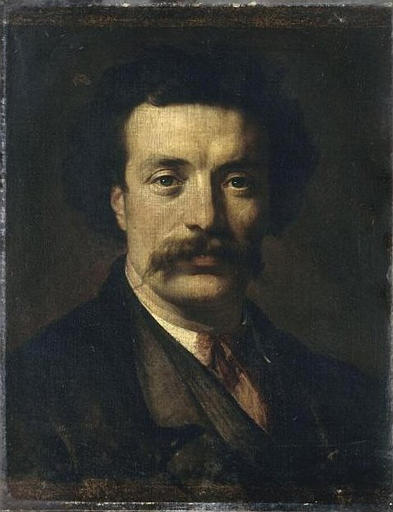
Ernest Hiolle, by Alphonse Monchablon.

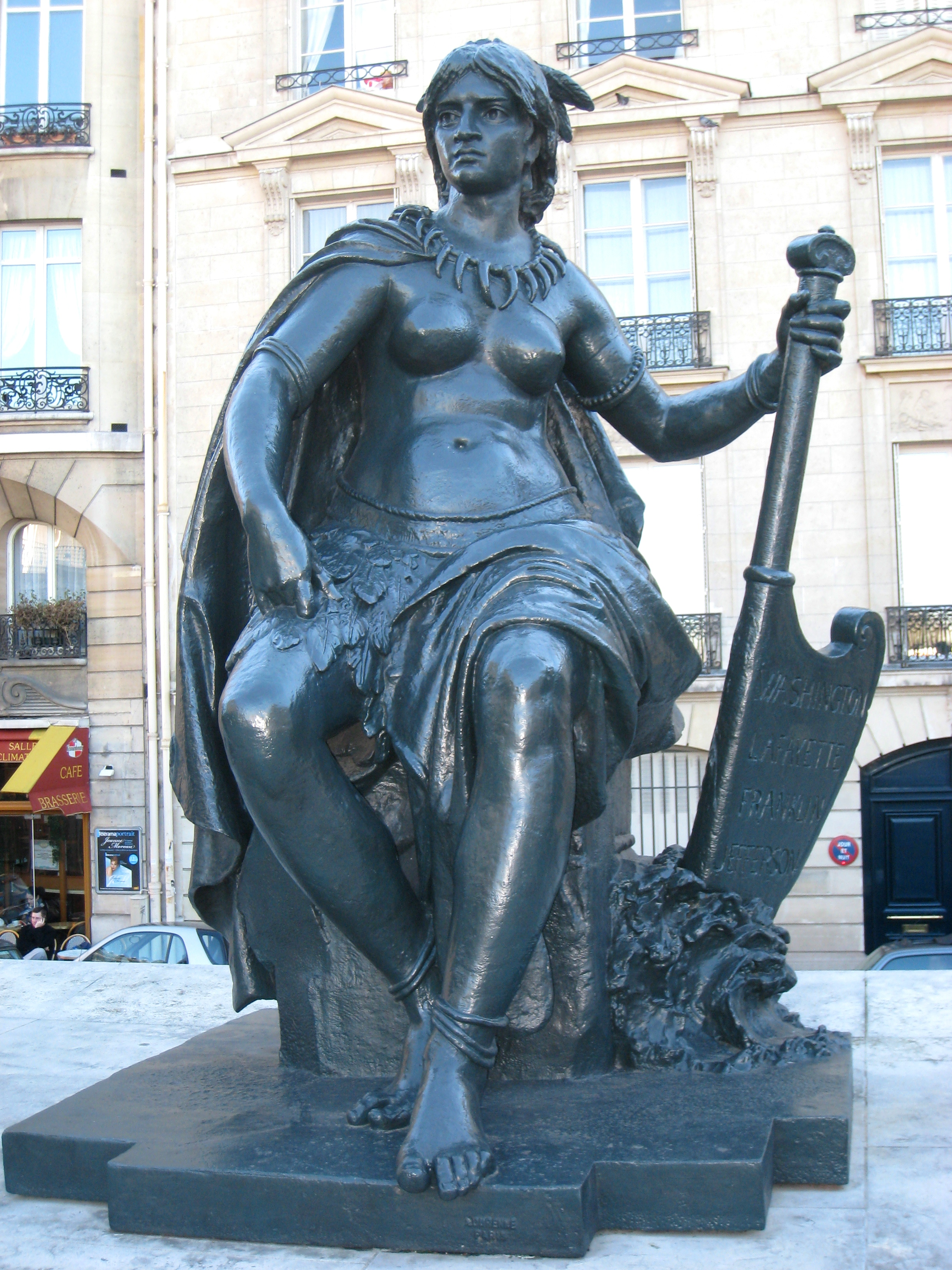
L'Amérique du Nord, by Ernest-Eugène Hiolle

Ernest-Eugène Hiolle (5 May 1834 – 5 October 1886) was a French sculptor who specialized in classical and allegorical figures in plaster and bronze, as well as many contemporary portrait busts.

Hiolle was born in Valenciennes, where he studied at the École Académique, before studying under François Jouffroy and Laurent Séverin Grandfils at the École des Beaux-Arts in Paris. He was runner up in the Prix de Rome of 1856 and in 1863 won the award. Exhibiting at the Salon from 1866, he won medals from 1867 to 1870. After 1870 he participated in the great public building projects of the French Third Republic with sculpture for the Palais Garnier, the Hôtel de Ville, Paris, and elsewhere. In 1873 he was made a Chevalier of the Légion d'honneur. At the salon of 1877 he exhibited bronze busts of Jouffroy and Jean-Baptiste Carpeaux, and at that of 1878 a bronze statue of General Maximilien Sebastien Foy. He also won a medal of honour at the Exposition Universelle (1878).

His students included Antonin Carlès.

== Selected works ==
- Narcissus, Jardin du Luxembourg, 1869
- Arion assis sur un dauphin, Jardin du Luxembourg, 1870
- St. Jean de Matha, Panthéon, 1878
- L'Amérique du Nord, Musée d'Orsay square

== Bibliography ==
- Clara Erskine Clement Waters, Laurence Hutton, Artists of the Nineteenth Century and Their Works, Houghton, Osgood, 1879.
- Answers.com entry
- Insecula entry
- Artnet entry
- Artfact entry
