= Jan Monchablon =

French painter

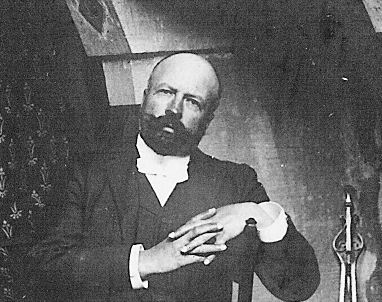
Jan Monchablon (date unknown)

Jean Baptiste Ferdinand Monchablon, known as Jan Monchablon (6 September 1854 – 2 October 1904) was a French landscape painter.

== Biography ==
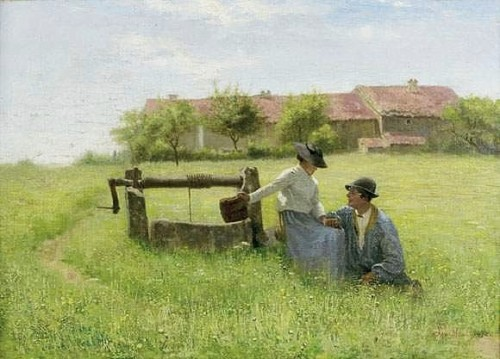
Lovers at the Well (date unknown)

He was born in Châtillon-sur-Saône. His father was an official with the local health department. Monchablon began his education at the Collège Notre-Dame in Nantes. In 1875, after working as a private tutor, he became a professor in Quimper. Six years later, he entered the École des Beaux-Arts, where he studied under Jean-Paul Laurens. From 1883 to 1884, he took further lessons in the studio of Alexandre Cabanel. Finding himself attracted to the works of the Flemish masters, he took a study trip to the Netherlands in 1886. It was at that time he began signing his name "Jan", instead of "Jean".

Upon his return, Monchablon married Fanny Julien, a pianist he had met while studying at the École, and they decided to settle in his hometown, leasing property there and planting a small vineyard to help defray expenses. Despite his relatively isolated location, he continued to exhibit regularly at the Salon and won several medals there as well as at the Exposition Universelle (1900).

Monchablon was admitted to the Legion d'honneur in 1895. He died in 1904 in Châtillon-sur-Saône.

His friend Roland Knoedler (an American art dealer), commissioned Antoine Bourdelle to create a monument in his honor, which was destroyed during World War II. A replacement was later created by the sculptor Marcel Joosen (born 1943).

Many of Monchablon's paintings are in small museums in the United States, including the Haggin Museum in Stockton, California.
