= Cape Martin =

Headland in the commune of Roquebrune-Cap-Martin

Coordinates: 43°44′59″N 7°29′14″E

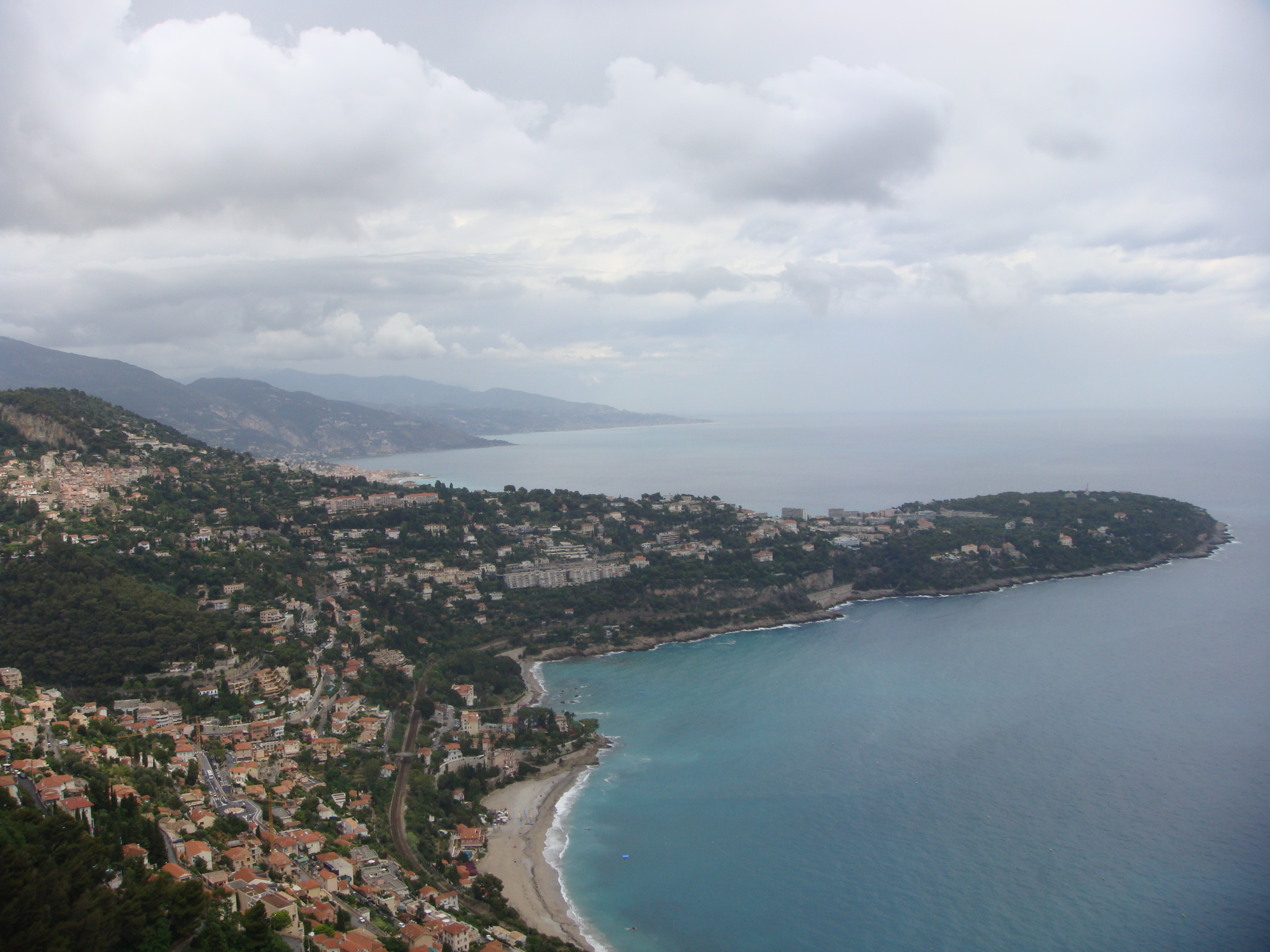
Cape Martin seen from the Principality of Monaco

Cape Martin (French: Cap Martin) is a headland situated in the commune of Roquebrune-Cap-Martin, Alpes-Maritimes département, in southern France. It is situated on the Mediterranean Sea coast between Monaco and Menton. Cap-Martin, an affluent residential area of Roquebrune-Cap-Martin, was named after the headland.
