= Gath & Chaves =

Defunct Argentine retail company

Gath & Chaves S.A.
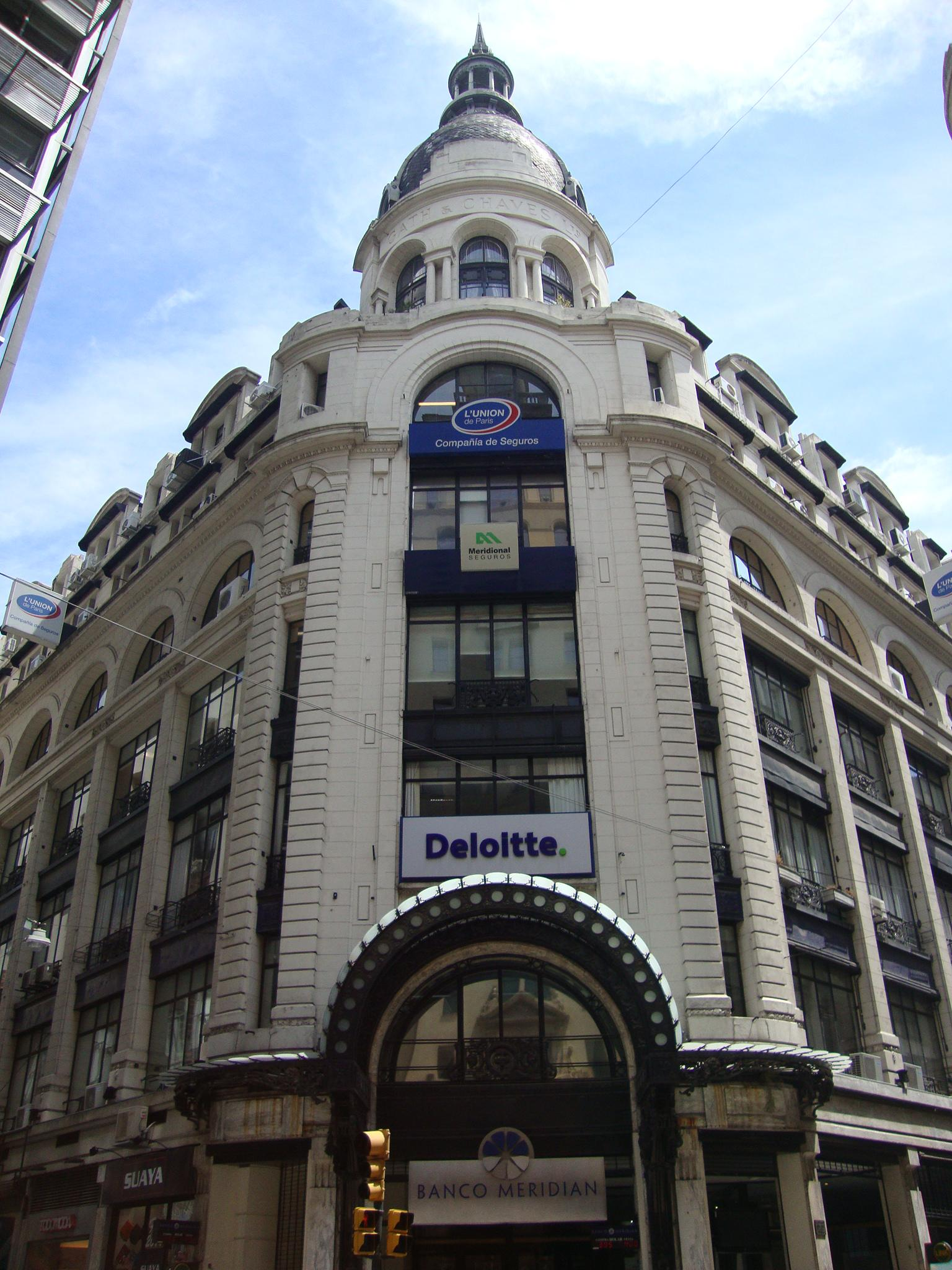
- Former Gath & Chaves main building in Buenos Aires photographed in 2011
- Formerly: The London Horsiery de Gath & Chaves (1883)
- Company type: Sociedad anónima
- Industry: Retail
- Founded: 1883
- Founder: Alfred Gath; Lorenzo Chaves
- Defunct: 1974; 52 years ago
- Headquarters: Buenos Aires, Argentina
- Area served: Argentina
- Products: List: Clothing; Furniture; Perfumes; Phonograph records; Shoes; Tableware; Toys
- Number of employees: 6,000 (1945)
- Parent: Harrods (1922–)
- Subsidiaries: Gath & Chaves Chile (1910–1952)

Gath y Chaves Sociedad Anónima (commonly given by the Argentines as "gatichaves") was an Argentine retail company headquartered in Buenos Aires and founded in 1883 by Lorenzo Chaves (1854–1928) and Alfred Gath (1852–1936). It was then acquired by English company Harrods, and was a favorite of the city's upper class. Among the large variety of products sold at Gath & Chaves stores were clothing, furniture, perfumes, phonograph records, shoes, tableware, and toys.

Gath & Chaves, along with Harrods Buenos Aires, were predecessor to shopping malls that appeared in the late 1980s in Argentina. The name Gath & Chaves is regarded as one of the most recognisable brands in Argentina.

== History ==
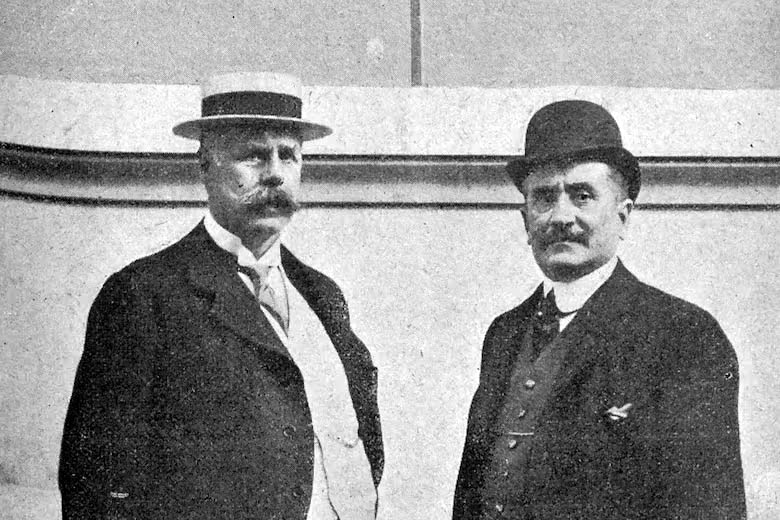
Alfred Gath (left) and Lorenzo Chávez, founders

Argentine Lorenzo Chaves and Englishman Alfred Henry Gath (arrived in Buenos Aires with his family in 1866 and devoted to livestock management) met at "Casa Burgos", another department store located on Cangallo and Florida, in 1873. On 7 July 1883 they founded "The London Horsiery de Gath & Chaves", their own company, to sell men clothing made with English fabric. The store was located on San Martín street n° 569, San Nicolás neighborhood. Two years later, the store added women's clothing, expanding the offer to furniture, perfumes, shoes, and other products.

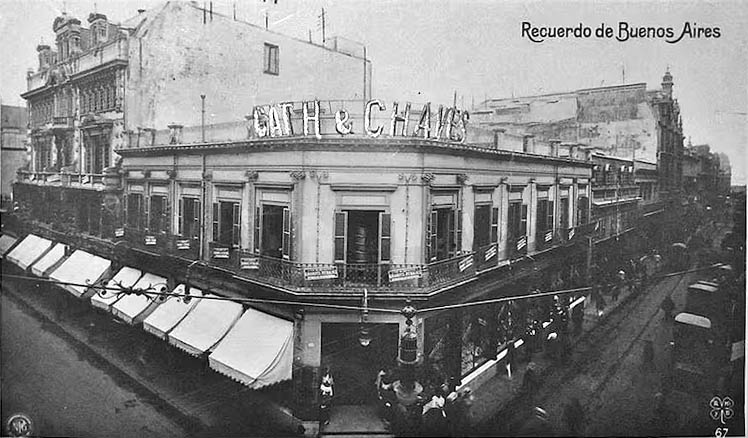
The first exclusive store on La Piedad and Florida streets

By 1901 the company inaugurated a first exclusive three floor-building on La Piedad and Florida streets. The building was designed by architect Lorenzo Siegerist.

In March 1908 the store became a sociedad anónima with a capital of $6,000,000. In September 1910 Gath & Chaves opened a store in Santiago, Chile. By those times the company had its own furniture factory on Agrelo street, a depot on Venezuela street, and a workshop on Pueyrredón Avenue, where 6,000 employees made suits and dresses that were then offered at $10,000,000.

On Avenida de Mayo and Perú there was an annex building dedicated to women's clothing exclusively. It had been designed by Edwin Merry for the Ortiz Basualdo family in the 1890s, and then remodelled by Salvatore Mirate when Gath & Chaves bought the property, being opened in 1908. The building became a coffeehouse in 1954. In 1909 the firm opened El Palacio de los Niños ("the Children's Palace") in an attempt to expand its range of customes.

After English companies showed their interest to invest in Gath & Chaves, in March 1912 the company merged with D'Erlanger and Co. and changed its name to "The South American Stores (Gath and Chaves) Ltd.". In exchange, the founders would receive a 5% profit until 15 January 1918 and Lorenzo Chaves was appointed as member of the managing board of London. British newspaper The Times stated on 30 May 1912 that G&C "is by far the biggest company in Argentina, similar to Le Bon Marché, Louvre, and Printemps stores in Paris, and another big stores in London".

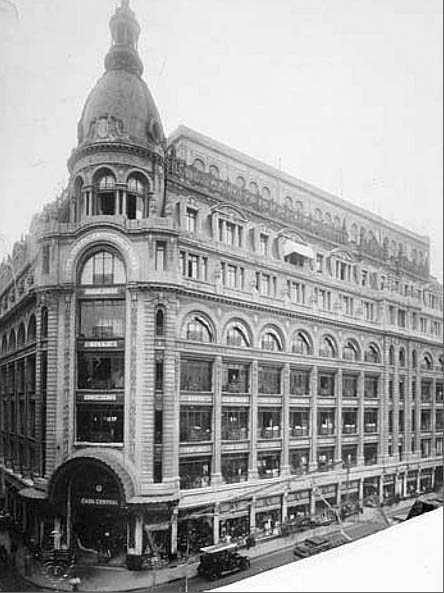
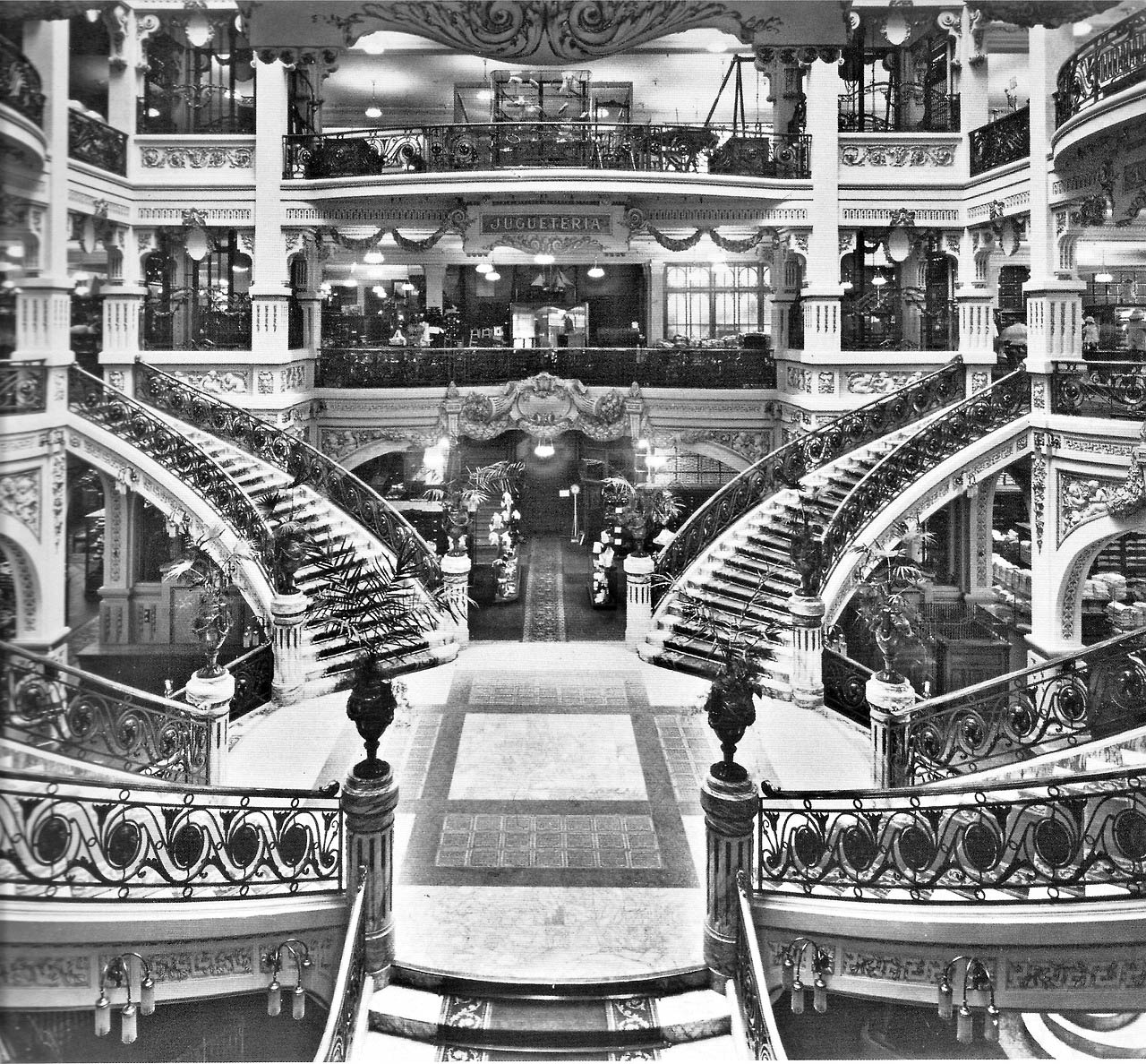
Two images of the main building ("Casa Central") opened in 1914; (left): exterior, (right): main hall with stairs and upper levels

Gath & Chaves opened a new building on Cangallo (today Teniente Gral. Perón) and Florida streets on 19 September 1914, setting it as main building or "Sede Central" as it was called. The 2,400 m2 building was designed by French architect Francisque Fleury Tronquoy. It had 8 floors and 5 undergrounds, being the most expensive of Buenos Aires. The design was inspired on "Le Bon Marché" and "Lafayette Galeries" of Paris. The main hall had four stairs, while on the top roof there was a coffeehouse.

In 1922, The South American Stores (Gath y Chaves) was taken over by British company Harrods. Three years later a twin building was opened just in front of the Sede Central, on Florida n° 232. It sold women's clothing and named "Anexo señoras". Both buildings were connected by an underground passage. In those years G&C also opened stores in cities of Buenos Aires province such as La Plata, Mercedes, Bahía Blanca, and Azul, then expanding to Rosario, Córdoba, Paraná, Mendoza, and San Miguel de Tucumán. Harrods also took over Chilean subsidiary The Chilean Stores (Gath y Chaves) that operated in Santiago, Valparaíso, Temuco, and Valdivia.

By 1945 the company had 19 stores and 6,000 employees. The Chilean subsidiary closed its doors in 1952 after a long strike action from its workers who demanded better salaries.

Gath & Chaves closed in 1974. The main building on Cangallo and Florida was refurbished, being occupied by Banco Meridian.

== Sports culture and legacy ==
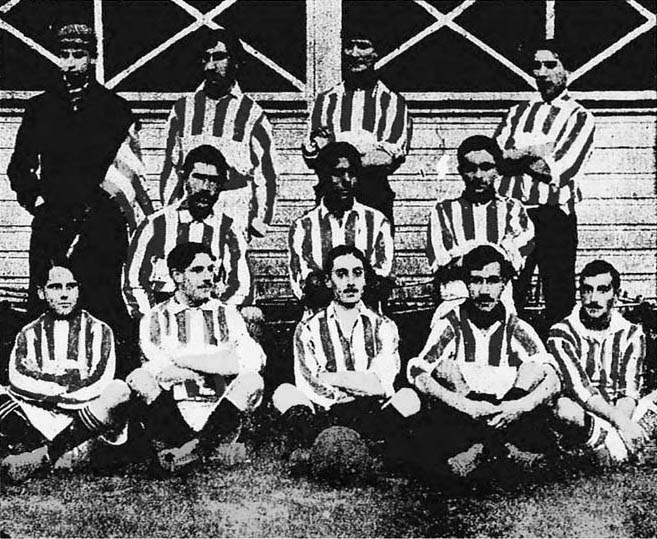
1907 champion team of Nacional de Floresta, the football club founded by Gath & Chaves workers

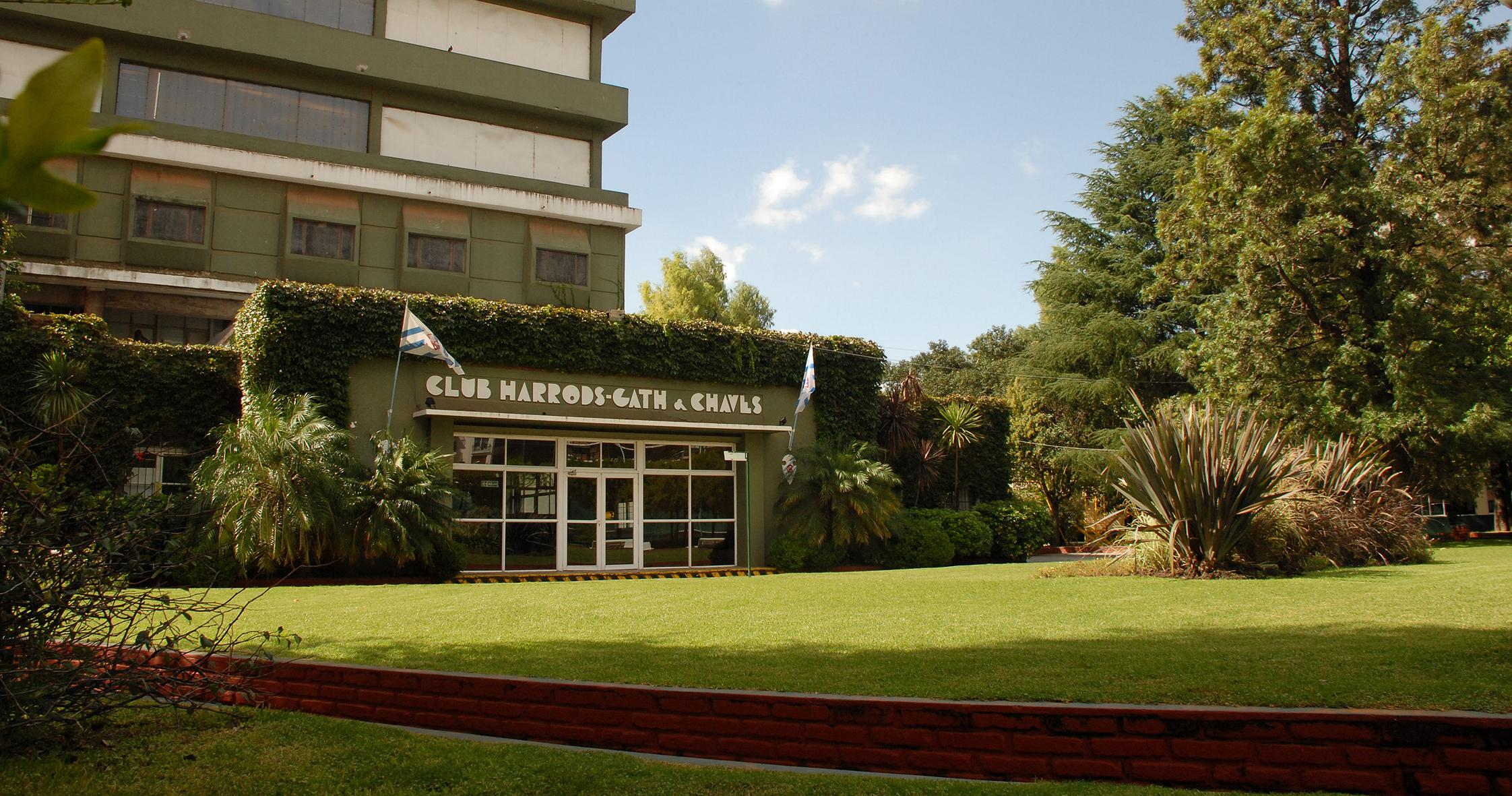
Club house of "Club Harrods Gath & Chaves" as seen in 2012. The sports club was established in 1918 and has remained since then

Workers of Gath & Chaves founded their own association football team, "Club Harrods Gath y Chaves" in 1905, affiliating to the Argentine Football Association (AFA). Nevertheless the club changed its name to "Club Atlético Nacional" in 1907 due to the use of commercial trademarks were forbidden by the association.

Nacional (mostly known as "Nacional de Floresta") competed in the lower divisions of Argentine football, winning a Segunda División title in 1907.

In 1918, "Club Harrods Gath & Chaves" was established after the merger of Club Athletic Harrod's (established by employees of Harrods Buenos Aires in 1915 and based in the Vicente López district) and Club Athletic Gath & Chaves (established in May 1918 and based in Virrey del Pino and Av. del Libertador). C.A. Harrod's activities included football, tennis, rugby, bocce, and pelota paleta. C.A. Gath & Chaves' sports included football, rugby, tennis, swimming, and artistic gymnastics. Both clubs merged on 22 November 1921 to form the current institution.

Gath & Chaves was the kit supplier for the Argentina national football team from 1925 to 1934.

== Gallery ==
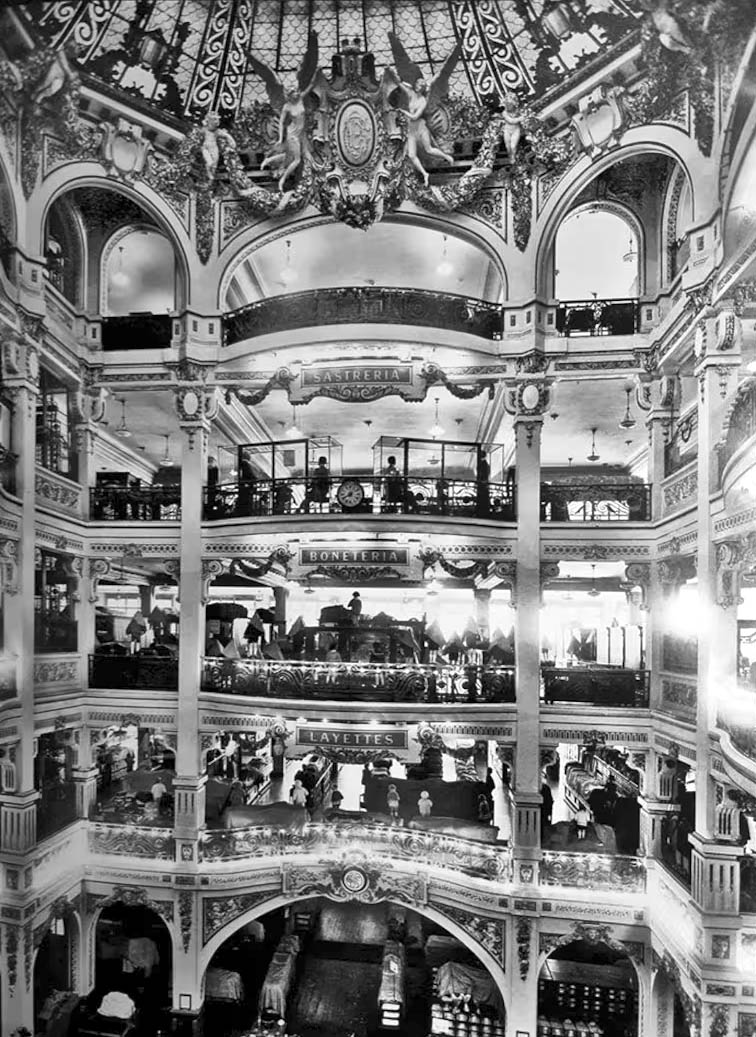
Floors of the main building

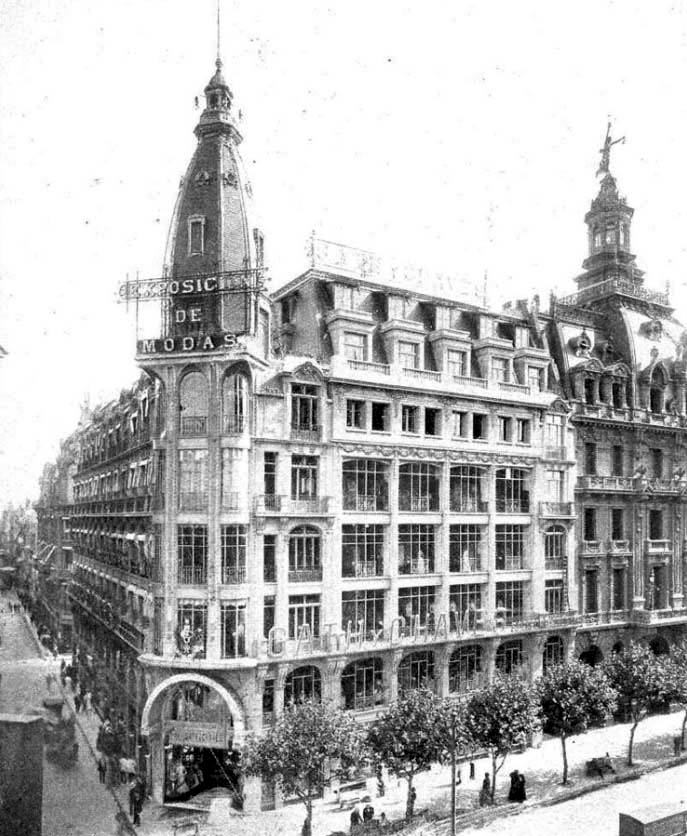
Annex building on Av. de Mayo and Peru

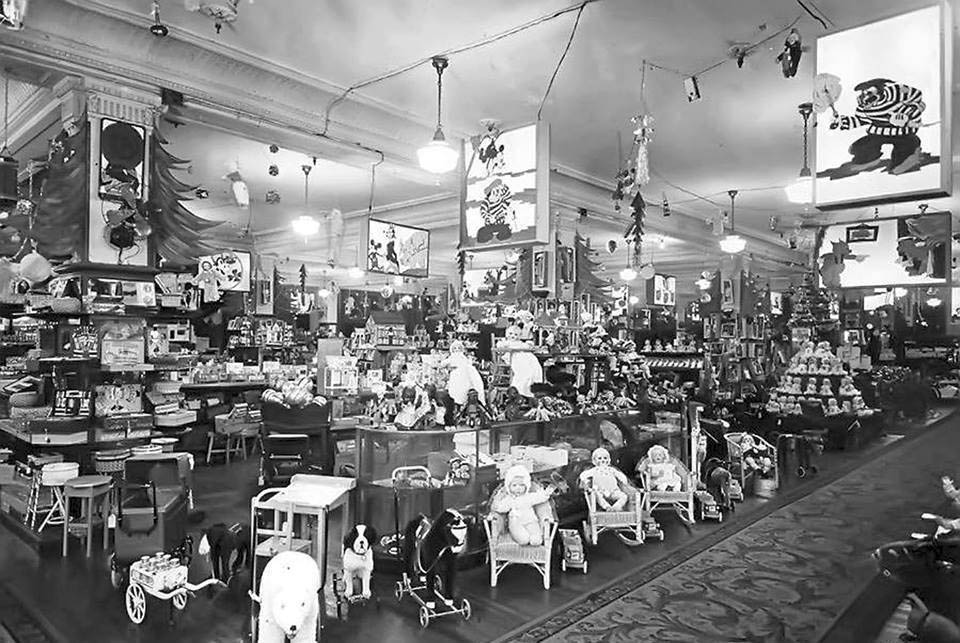
Toy store, 1934

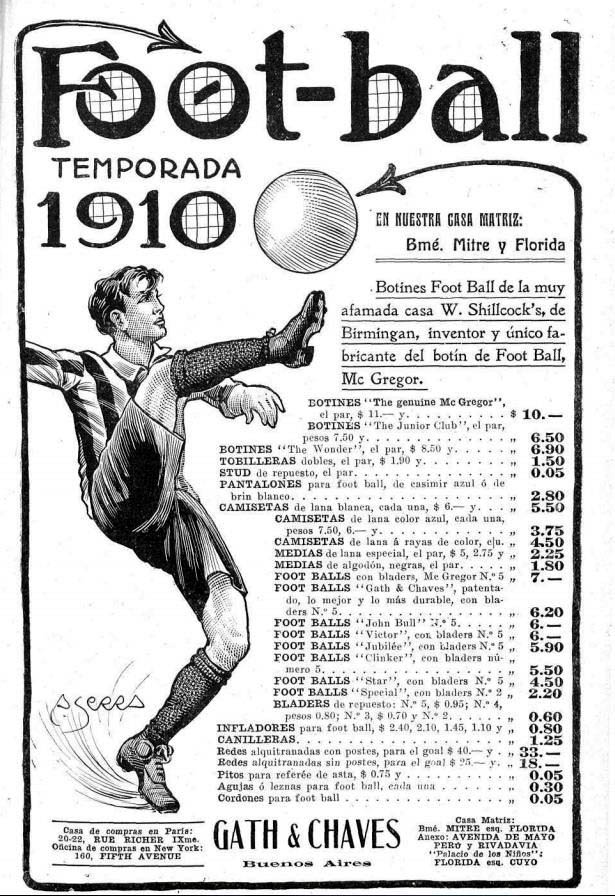
1910 advertisement of football products

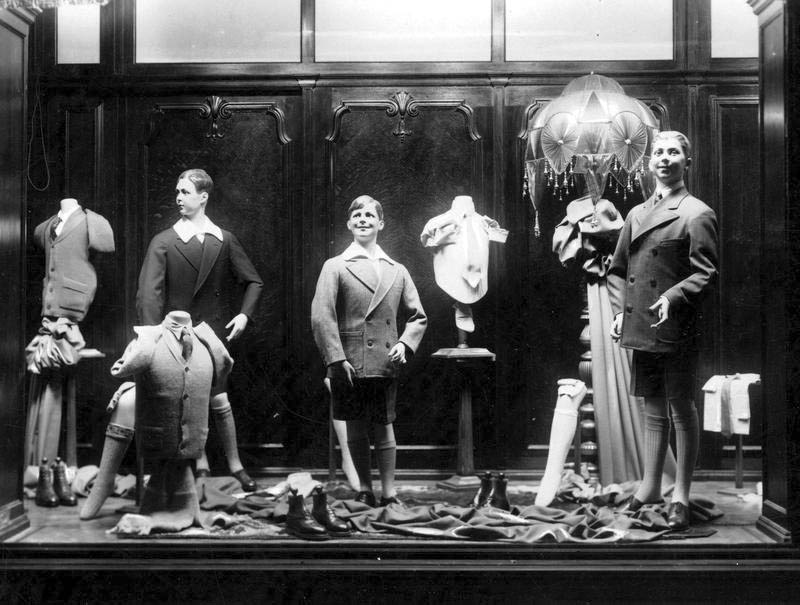
Clothing exhibited at the G&C store in Azul, Buenos Aires
