= Louvre Saint-Honoré =

Historic structure in Paris, France

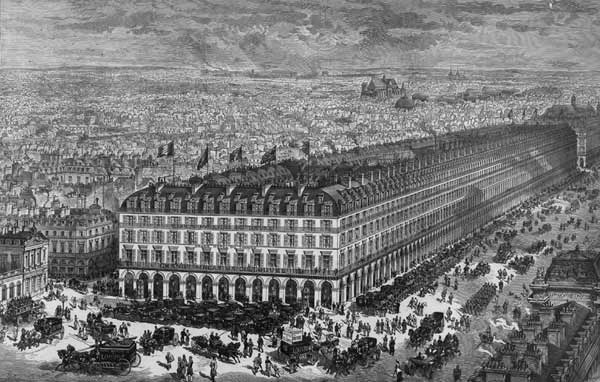
- The property in a 1877 engraving

- Location within Paris

General information
- Location: France
- Coordinates: 48.862093°N 2.338161°E
- Groundbreaking: 1855

Design and construction
- Architects: Alfred Armand, Charles Rohault de Fleury, Auguste Pellechet, Wladimir Lentzy, B.Architecture, Jean Nouvel

The Louvre Saint-Honoré building is a historic structure in Paris, occupying an entire urban block between the rue de Rivoli (across the Louvre Palace), the place du Palais-Royal, the rue Saint-Honoré, and the rue de Marengo, with a total floor surface of 47,000 square meters. It was originally erected in the early 1850s by the Pereire brothers who in 1855 opened an iconic hotel, the Grand Hôtel du Louvre, and an innovative street-level department store, branded from 1863 the Grands Magasins du Louvre. While the Grand Hôtel closed in 1887, the Grands Magasins expanded and kept operating in the building until 1974. From 1978 to 2016 they were succeeded by a specialized mall of antiques shops, the Louvre des Antiquaires, while the upper floors were repurposed as rented office space. Since 2020, the building's lower levels have been undergoing conversion to become the new flagship home of the Fondation Cartier pour l'Art Contemporain.

== Initial construction ==
The completion of the rue de Rivoli between the place du Louvre and the place des Pyramides was an early project of Haussmann's renovation of Paris as desired by Napoleon III, and coincided with the preparation of the Exposition Universelle (1855). The Pereire brothers were eager to contribute and in 1854 established the société immobilière des terrains de la rue de Rivoli, complemented in December 1854 with the Compagnie de l'Hôtel et des Immeubles de la rue de Rivoli. They directed the construction of the massive urban block along the thoroughfare while Napoleon III's Louvre expansion was being completed across it. They commissioned their customary architect Alfred Armand, who was assisted for the project by Jacques Ignace Hittorff, Charles Rohault de Fleury and Auguste Pellechet, and strictly adhered for the external facades to Percier and Fontaine's stern design guidelines for the rue de Rivoli dating from the time of Napoleon I.

== Grand Hôtel du Louvre ==
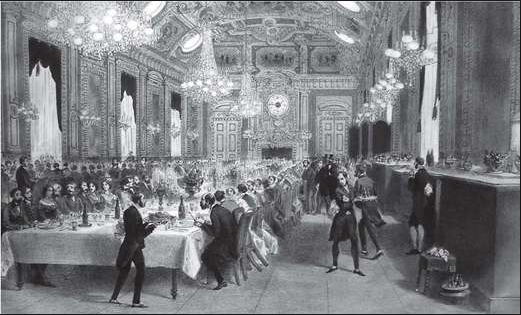
The main table d'hôte, c. 1870

The Grand Hôtel du Louvre was inaugurated on 9 July 1855, a few weeks into the Exposition Universelle that had opened on 1 May 1855, but its actual operations only started on 15 October 1855 and reached a steady state in early 1856. Partly inspired by the Great Western Royal Hotel in London, it was the largest hotel in Europe, with over 700 rooms and a staff of 1,250. It provided interpreters and guides, a post office, a telegraph room and a bureau de change. Although the hotel's common spaces were spectacularly opulent, it also catered to tourists with modest budgets as well as to the wealthy. A massive stairway led from the courtyard to the table d'hôte dining room, which often accommodated over 300 diners. There was also a more expensive restaurant, a salon 41 metres (135 ft) in length and a large billiard room. The modern hotel included many bathrooms and twenty lavatories. Another innovative feature was a pair of steam-powered lifts. Félix-Joseph Barrias was commissioned to paint frescoes in the monumental dining room, which was 40 meters long and 30 meters wide. An 1872 Baedeker guide described the Grand Hôtel du Louvre as "a huge, palatial edifice, the construction of which cost upwards of 50,000 £."

The hotel closed on 1 November 1887 to allow for the expansion of the Grands Magasins du Louvre. In 1888 the Hôtel du Louvre opened on the other side of the Place du Palais Royal, and has remained in the same location since then.

== Grands Magasins du Louvre ==
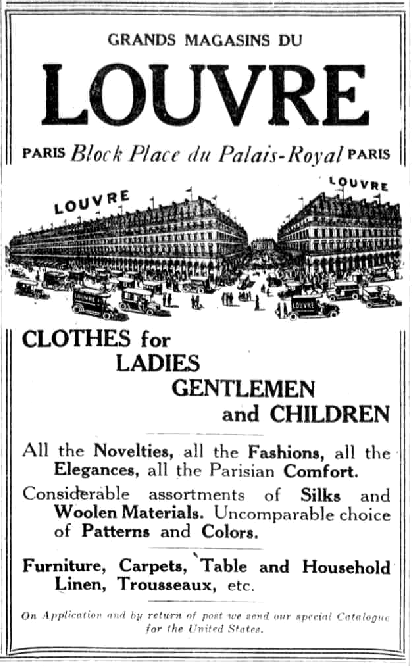
Advert for the Grands Magasins du Louvre, 1919, showing the annex across rue de Marengo

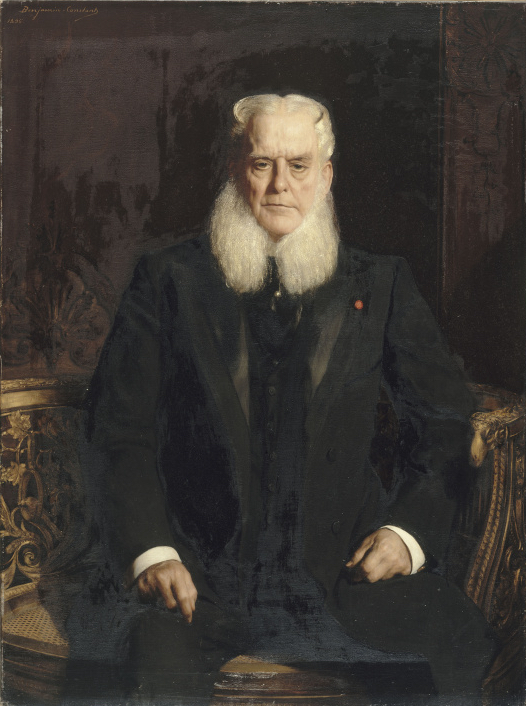
Alfred Chauchard (1821–1909) in 1896, by Jean-Joseph Benjamin-Constant

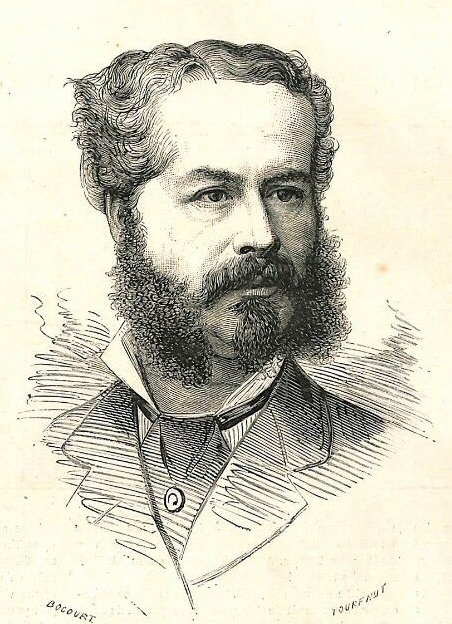
Auguste Hériot (1826–1879) in 1879

As the hotel opened in 1855, the building's street level and mezzanine (French: entresol) were devoted to a commercial mall with 41 luxury shops at the time of inauguration. Much of it was taken by Les Galeries du Louvre, the second modern department store in Paris after Le Bon Marché which had opened in 1852, which opened on 9 July 1855. The Galeries was operated by Alfred Chauchard, who had previously been a clerk at a store named Au Pauvre Diable with a salary of 25 Francs per month, and his partners Auguste Hériot and Léonce Faré, through a commercial venture formed on 26 March 1855 that rented the space from the Pereires' landlord entity, itself renamed in 1858 the Compagnie immobilière de Paris. Faré withdrew in 1857 and the company became Chauchard, Hériot et Compagnie, in which the Pereires took shares in the early 1860s. In 1863, the mall was rebranded as the Grands Magasins du Louvre. In 1865, it realised 15 million in sales and 41 million ten years later. It employed about 2,400 people, and Chauchard and Hériot became extremely rich. Following remodeling that started in the late 1860s, on 17 March 1873 the department store opened an expansion that brought it to a floor surface of 13,700 square meters, which its boasted as the world's largest.

Following the difficulties faced by the Pereires in the late 1860s, the Compagnie immobilière de Paris was dissolved on 30 June 1872. On 14 August 1875, Chauchard, Hériot et Compagnie bought the whole building from the administrators, and subsequently tasked architect Henry Dubois with its remodeling including the transformation of the main interior courtyards into covered atriums. Initially they kept the hotel in operation, but eventually closed it on 1 November 1887 for another expansion of the department store, which was completed in 1888.

After Auguste Hériot died in 1879, his brother Olympe Hériot inherited his shares of the company. Chauchard sold his shares in 1885. Olympe in 1887 married Cyprienne Dubernet, a former saleswoman at the store, and directed the company alone until 1888, when first signs of his mental illness forced his resignation. He was succeeded by one of Émile Pereire's sons. In 1889, the company was renamed Société du Louvre and opened a second hotel, the Grand Hotel Terminus in front of the Gare Saint-Lazare (later Hilton Paris Opéra), whose hall was designed by Gustave Eiffel. In 1909, the company opened the Hôtel de Crillon on the Place de la Concorde, after its renovation. In 1930, the shares were registered in the official list of the Paris Bourse.

In 1909, the Grands Magasins expanded into an annex across rue de Marengo, connected to the main building by an underground passage. In 1914, following the start of World War I, part of the complex was repurposed as a military hospital managed by the Val-de-Grâce. In 1919, another annex was created for the expansion of reserve space across rue Saint-Honoré, designed by architect Georges Vaudoyer. That building was repurposed in 2002–2005 on a design by architect Francis Soler with a distinctive metal screen in front of the facades, to host central offices of the French Ministry of Culture. The Grands Magasins du Louvre, however, suffered from the crisis of the 1930s and their activity declined significantly in 1933–1934.

An Avro Lancaster airplane from the No. 57 Squadron RAF, based at RAF East Kirkby, was hit by German flak and crashed into the building on the night of September 23, 1943, causing significant damage inside the building while leaving the exterior walls standing. The Canadian pilot, Joe Douglas Hogan, and six crew members were all killed. Repairs and additional structural changes were made in the immediate postwar period. From the mid-1950s, the Société du Louvre started renting out office space in the upper levels to prestige tenants, e.g. IBM, and street-level commercial space to third-party retailers, e.g. Prisunic. On 10 January 1973, it sold the entire property to the Société de Financement et de Participation Immobilière (FIPARIM), which closed the department store and Prisunic on 15 June 1974.

== Louvre des Antiquaires ==
The building was entirely reconstructed by its new owner, with demolition works starting in February 1976, on a design by architect Wladimir Lentzy that only kept from the prior structure the street facades as well as the façades of the westernmost inner courtyard. The Louvre des Antiquaires opened on 26 October 1978 with 240 antiques shops on three levels, namely a basement, the street level and the first floor. It also hosted occasional temporary exhibitions. The upper floors were commercialized as an office building, the Centre d'Affaires Le Louvre, with tenants that included the Ministry of Finance, Bank of France, Crédit Lyonnais, Banque Française du Commerce Extérieur, Industrial Bank of Japan, and U.S. Embassy.

In 1987, the Louvre des Antiquaires opened an offshoot in New York City, but that was closed in 1992.

In 1995, the Société foncière lyonnaise (SFL) acquired FIPARIM, and fully absorbed it in 2004. After years of financial trouble and an increasing number of vacancies, the Louvre des Antiquaires closed in 2016.

== Fondation Cartier – Louvre Palais Royal ==
Since 2020, the SFL has redeveloped the property on designs by architecture firms B.Architecture and Ateliers Jean Nouvel. As part of the redevelopment, the Fondation Cartier pour l'Art Contemporain will use 6,000 square meters on the former footprint of the Louvre des Antiquaires, as a new site branded Fondation Cartier – Louvre Palais Royal. As of late 2022, the opening date was expected in 2024 or 2025.

== In popular culture ==
The Grands Magasins du Louvre inspired Émile Zola's novel Au Bonheur des Dames (1883).

== Gallery ==
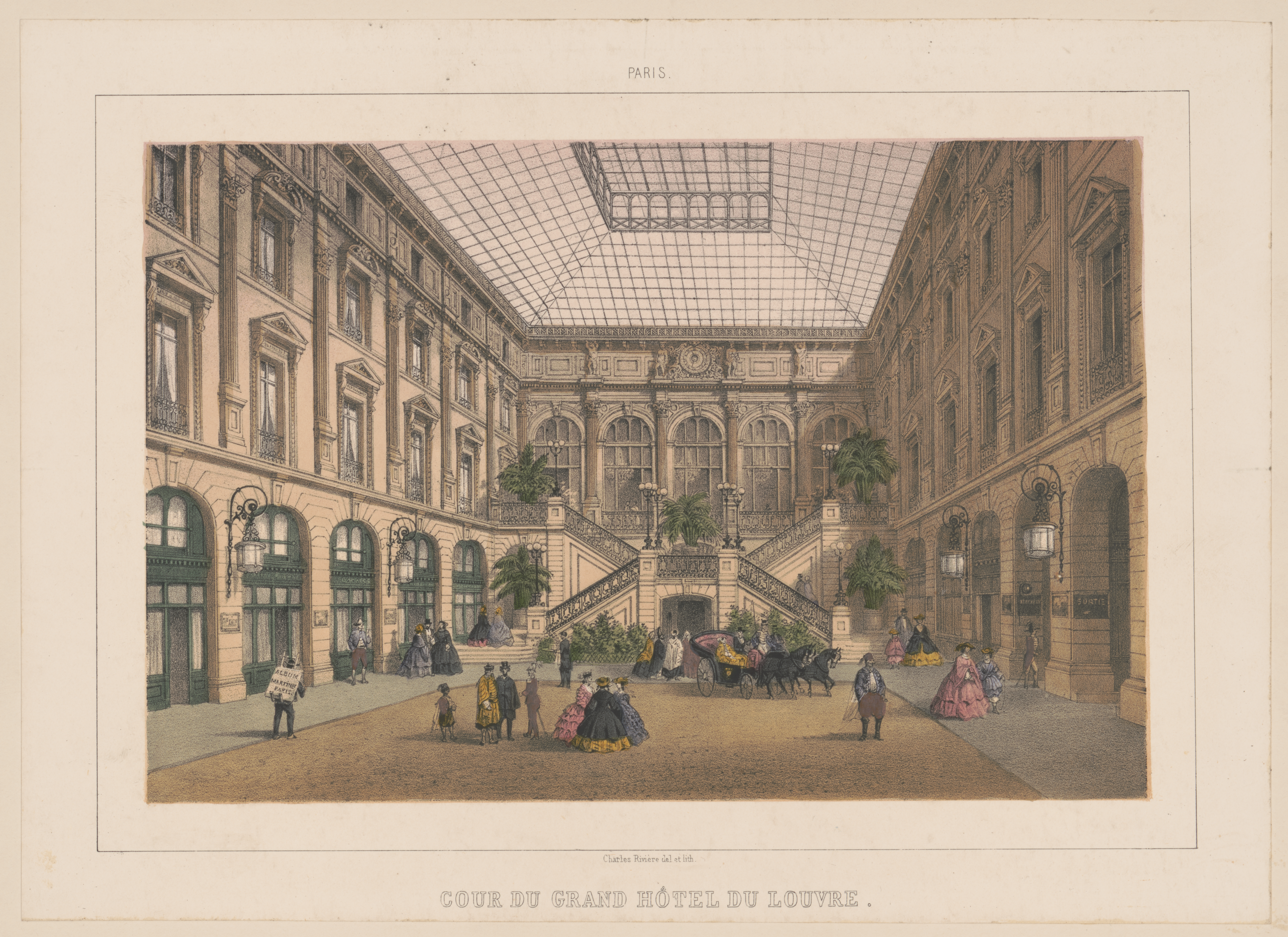
Interior courtyard and grand staircase in the 1870s

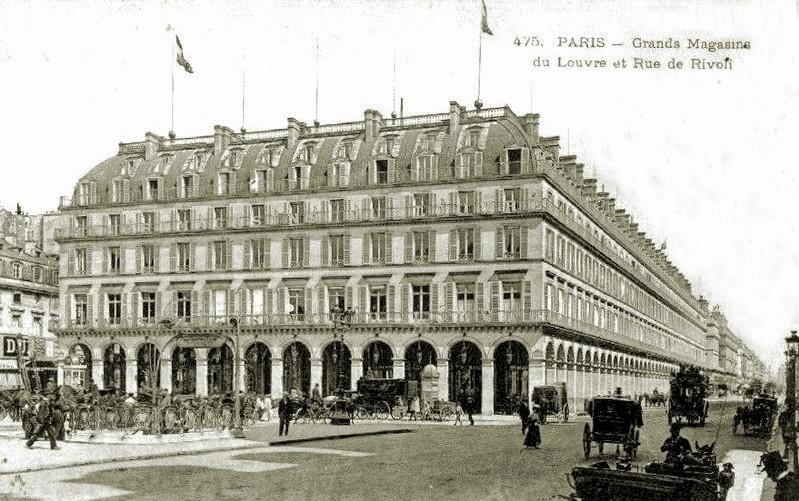
The Grands Magasins du Louvre in the 1890s

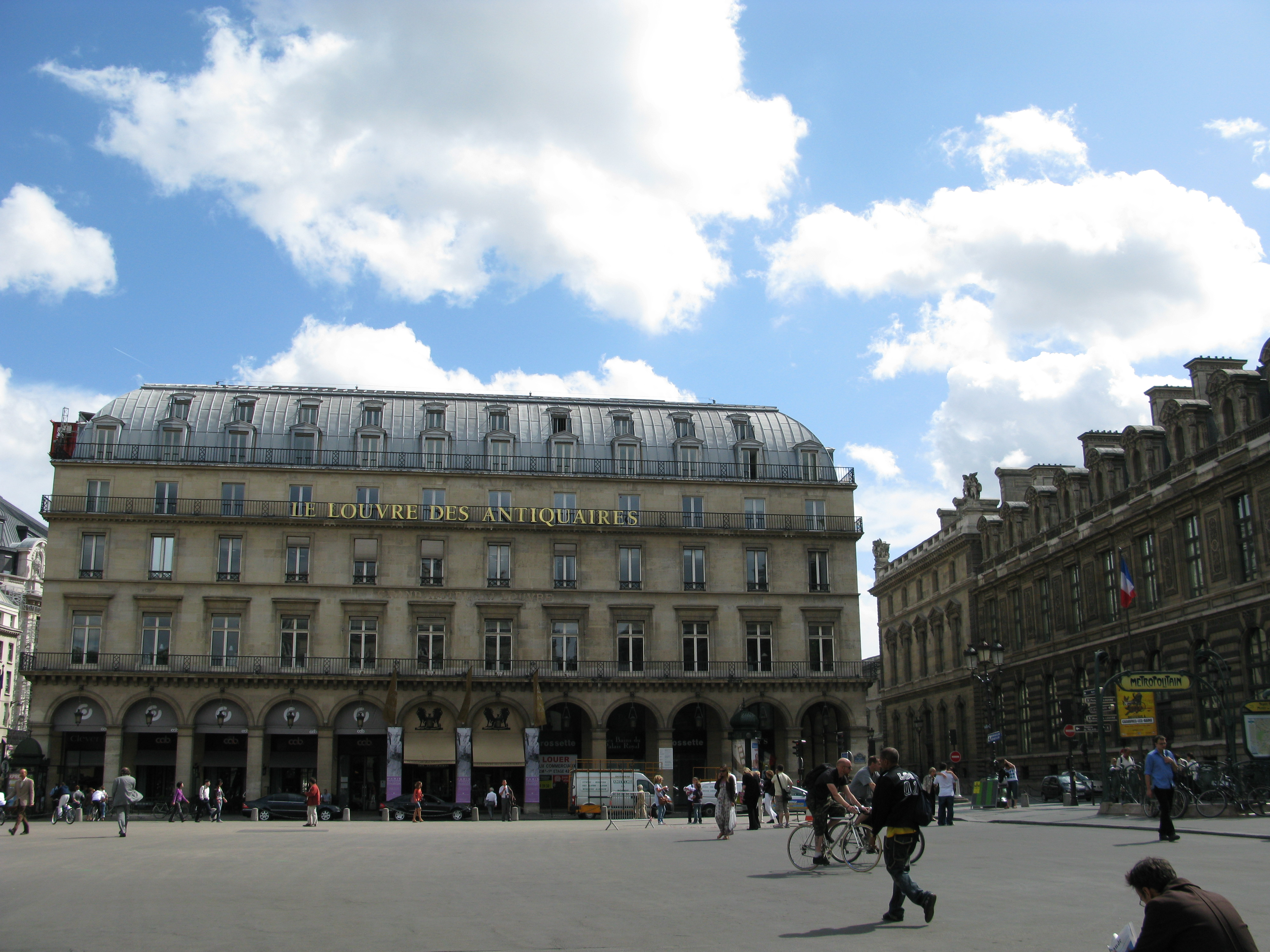
Louvre des antiquaires, 2009

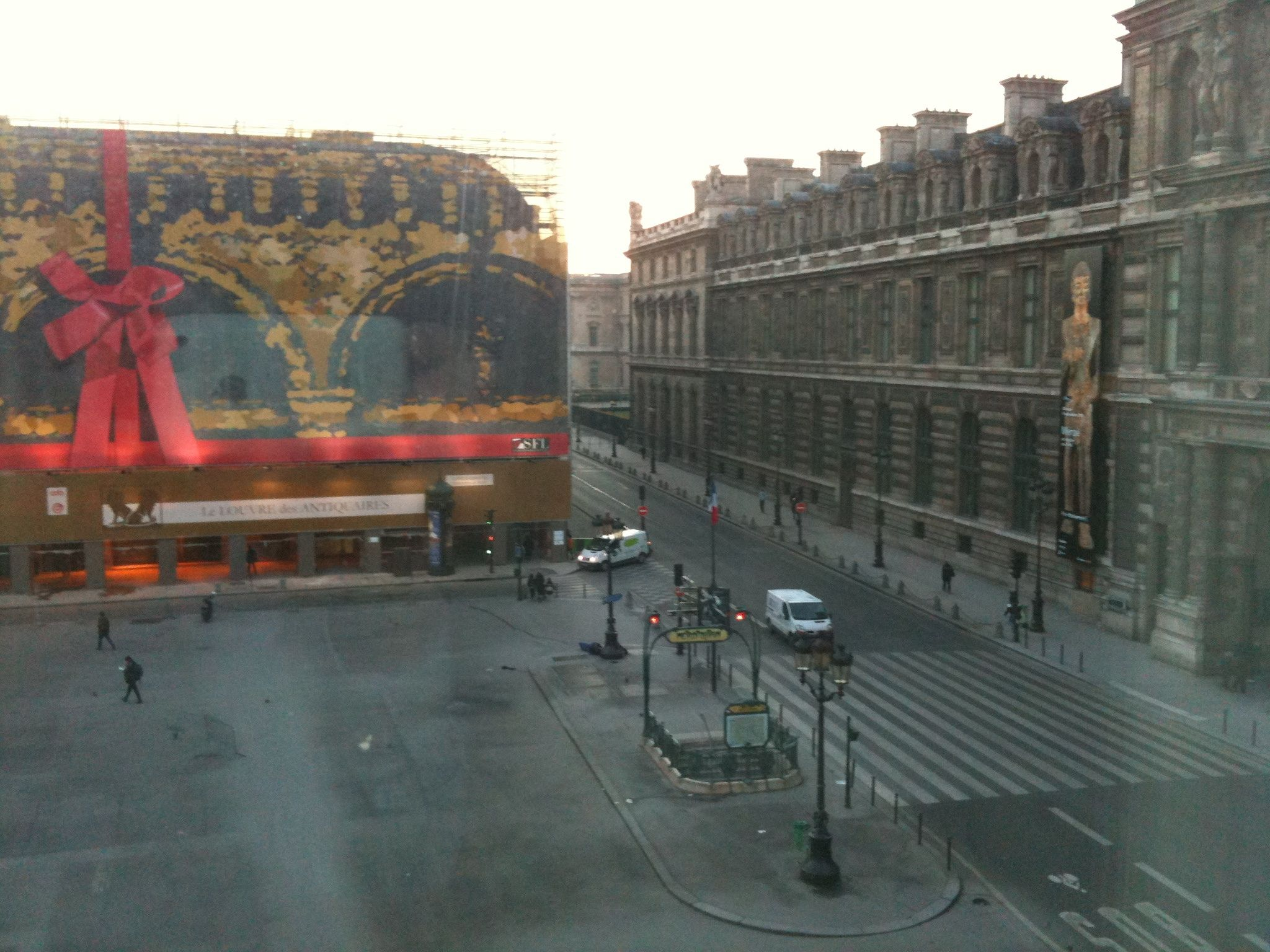
Renovations being undertaken in 2013

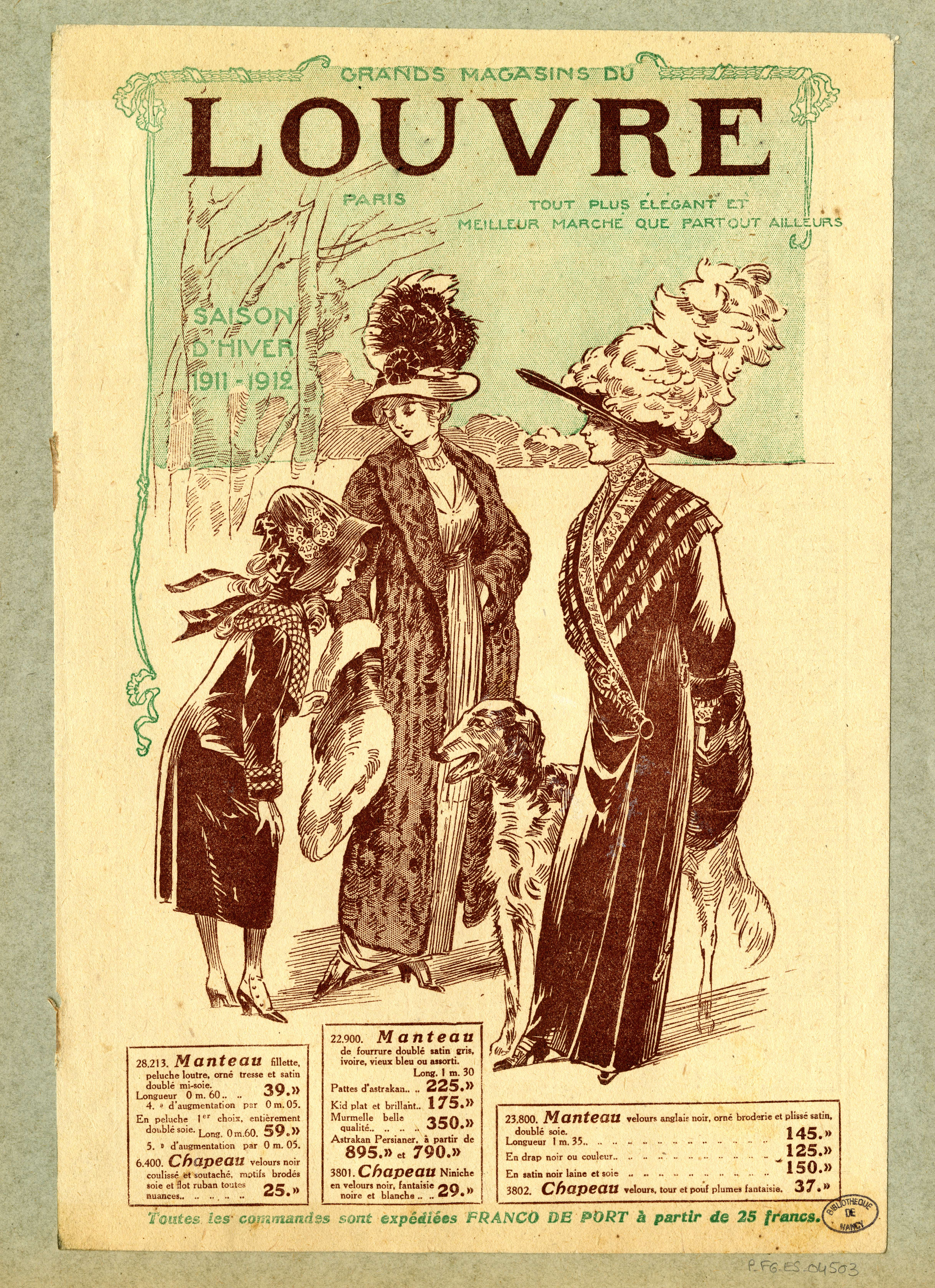
Advert for the Grands Magasins du Louvre, early 20th century

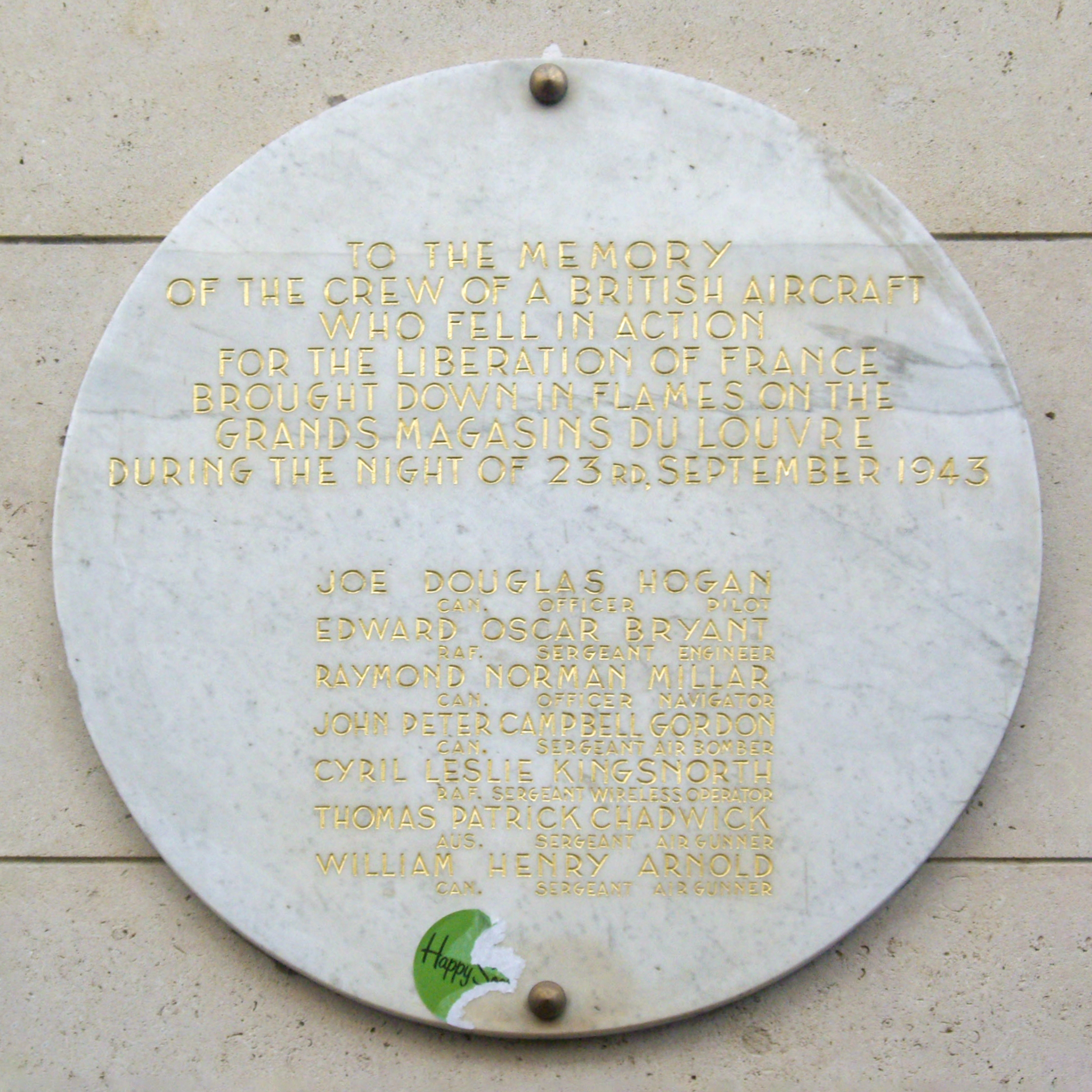
Plaque memorializing the British crew who died in the aircraft crash on 23 September 1943

== See also ==
- Debenhams
- Harrods
- Le Bon Marché
- À la Belle Jardinière
- Printemps
- La Samaritaine

== Sources ==
- Baedeker, Karl (1872). Paris and Northern France: Handbook for Travellers. K. Baedeker. p. 4.
- Denby, Elaine (1998). Grand Hotels: Reality and Illusion. Reaktion Books. ISBN 978-1-86189-121-1.
- "Grand Hotel du Louvre". Expedia.
- "The Oldest Grand Hotel of Paris". famoushotels.org. 26 May 2009.
- "Un hôtel historique". Hôtel du Louvre.
- Vajda, Joanne (2008). "Les Pereire et les Nalgelmackers, promoteurs du transport ferroviaire et du réseau hôtelier parisien, 1855-1900". Revue d'histoire des chemins de fer (38): 27–44. doi:10.4000/rhcf.1256. ISSN 0996-9403.
- Viardot, Louis (1883). "Barrias, Félix-Joseph". The masterpieces of French art illustrated: being a biographical history of art in France, from the earliest period to and including the Salon of 1882. Gebbie.
