= La Boissière-École =

- Commune
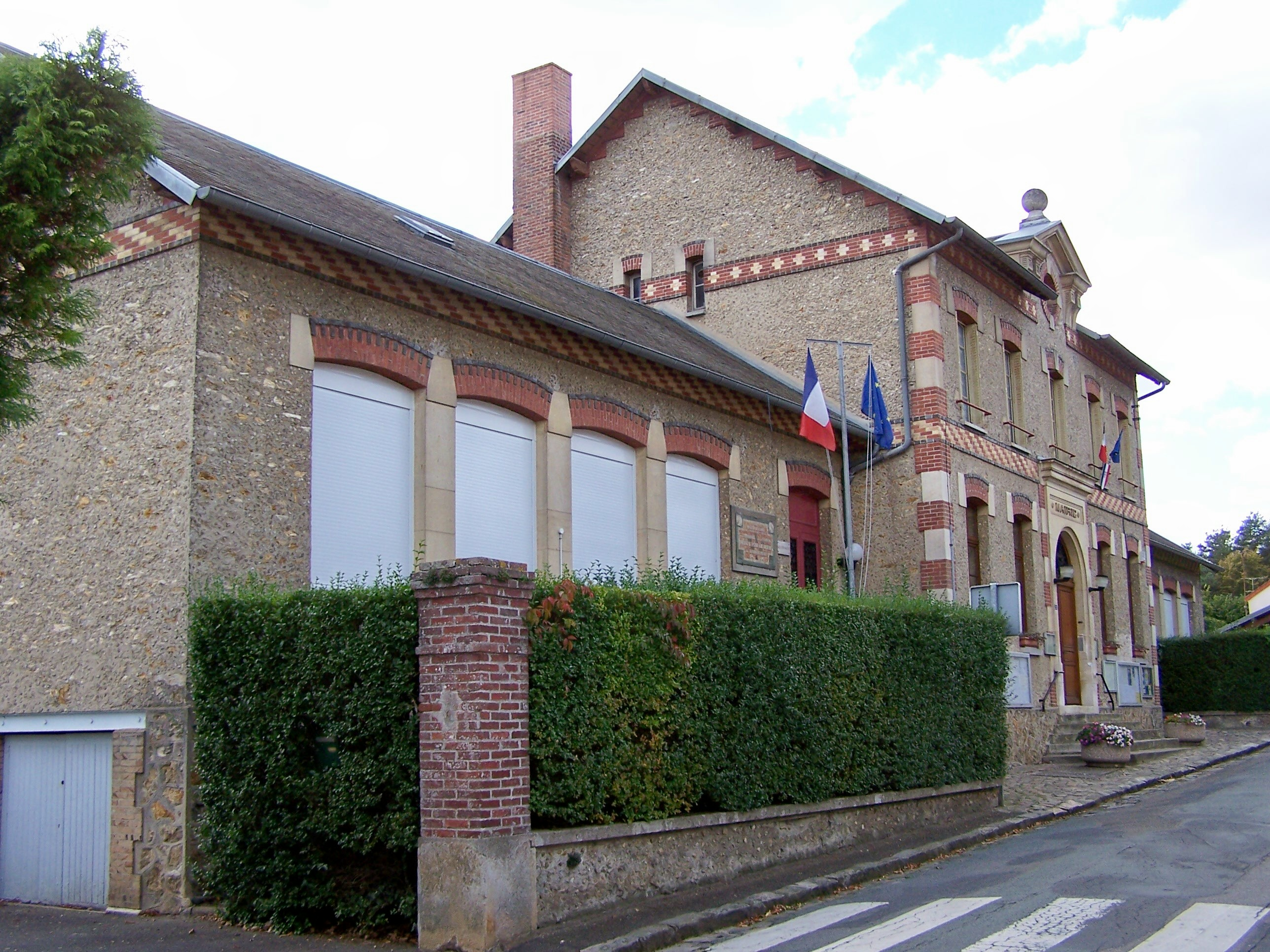
- Town hall

- Coat of arms
- Location of La Boissière-École
- Location within France Location within Île-de-France (region)
- Coordinates: 48°40′59″N 1°38′35″E
- Country: France
- Region: Île-de-France
- Department: Yvelines
- Arrondissement: Rambouillet
- Canton: Rambouillet
- Intercommunality: CA Rambouillet Territoires

Government
  - Mayor (2020–2026): Anne-Françoise Gaillot
- Area^{1}: 25.06 km^{2} (9.68 sq mi)
- Elevation: 171 m (561 ft)
- Highest elevation: 184 m (604 ft)
- Lowest elevation: 126 m (413 ft)
- Population (2023): 747
  - Density: 29.8/km^{2} (77.2/sq mi)
- Time zone: UTC+01:00 (CET)
  - Summer (DST): UTC+02:00 (CEST)
- INSEE/Postal code: 78077 /78125
- ^{1} French Land Register data, which excludes lakes, ponds, glaciers > 1 km^{2} (0.386 sq mi or 247 acres) and river estuaries.

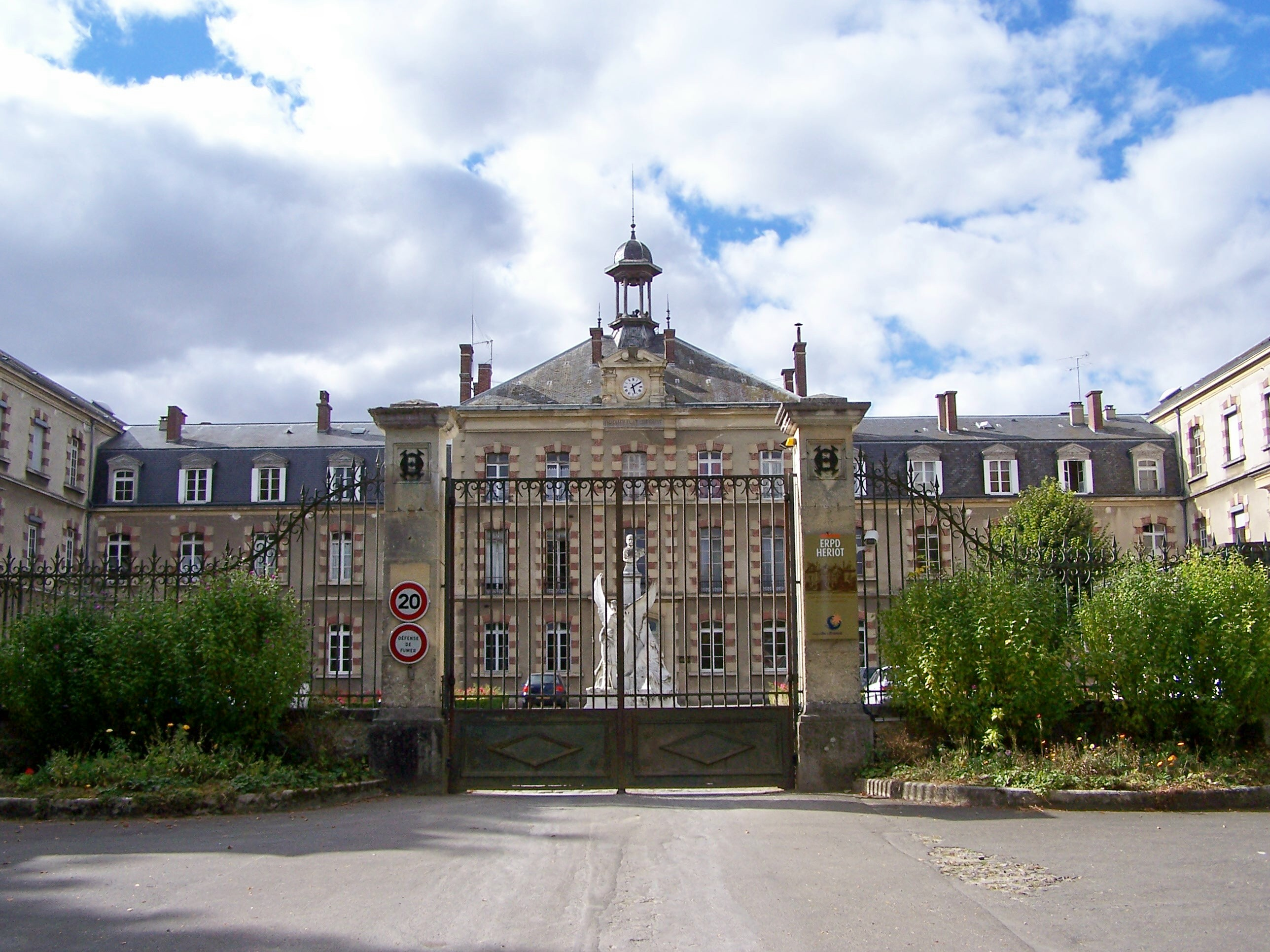
Hériot orphanage and school

La Boissière-École (French pronunciation: [la bwasjɛʁ ekɔl]) is a commune in the Yvelines department in north-central France.

== Geography ==
The village is located in the Southern West of Yvelines. Most of the landscape is constituted of forest. The place is separated in two. The castle and the Olympe Hériot school are in "La Basse Boissière" but most of the inhabitants live in "La Haute Boissière". La Gâtine and Mauzaize are in the west of the village centre. Nearby villages include Adainville, Condé-sur-Vesgre, Poigny-la-Forêt, Hermeray, Mittainville, and La Hauteville. It can be reached by the 71 road and the 80.

== Economy ==
In the east of the village, tourists can enjoy an equestrian centre. The principal activity of the village is farming: "La Tremblay".

== See also ==
- Communes of the Yvelines department
