= Kokkedal railway station =

Railway station in North Zealand, Denmark

Kokkedal
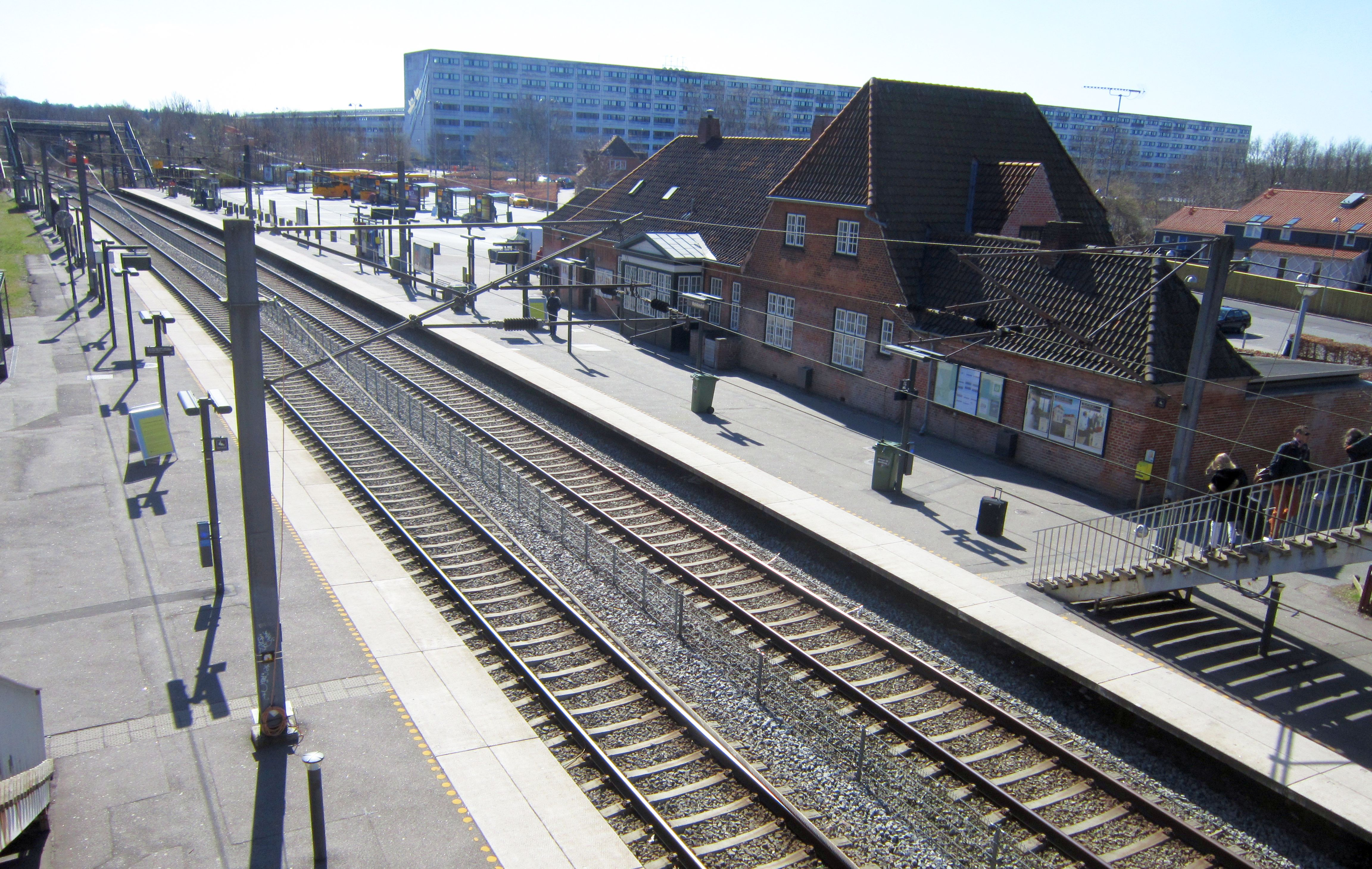
- Kokkedal Station in 2002

General information
- Location: Kokkedal Stationsvej 6; 2970 Hørsholm; Hørsholm Municipality; Denmark
- Coordinates: 55°54′13″N 12°30′08″E
- Elevation: 12.7 metres (42 ft)
- Owner: DSB (station infrastructure); Banedanmark (rail infrastructure)
- Line: Coast Line
- Platforms: 2
- Tracks: 2
- Train operators: DSB
- Connections: Bus: 150S, 353, 365R, 383, 500S

Other information
- Website: Official website

History
- Opened: 1906
- Rebuilt: 1944

Services
Preceding station	DSB	Following station
Nivå towards Helsingør	Elsinore–Copenhagen– Roskilde–Holbæk Regional train	Rungsted Kyst towards Holbæk
Nivå towards Helsingør	Elsinore–Copenhagen– Roskilde–Næstved Regional train	Rungsted Kyst towards Næstved
Nivå towards Helsingør	Elsinore–Copenhagen– Køge–Næstved Regional train Peak hours	Hellerup towards Næstved
Location

Kokkedal Station is a railway station serving the suburb of Kokkedal on the east coast of North Zealand, north of central Copenhagen.

The station is located on the coast between Helsingør and Copenhagen. The train services are currently operated by Danish State Railways.

== Bus Links ==
There are currently five bus routes which operate out of the station (30/10/2017), of which two are S-buses, two are local services and one is an R-bus.

Services are as follows:

- 150S to Nørreport St.
- 500S to Ørestad St.
- 353 to Helsingør St.
- 383 to Mikkelborg Park
- 383 to Rungsted Kyst St.
- 365R to Fredensborg St.

At peak times, the S-bus routes operate with 6 buses-per-hour (bph), the local routeswith 2 bph and the R-bus with 2 bph.

== See also ==
- List of railway stations in Denmark
