= Rungsted Kyst railway station =

Railway station in North Zealand, Denmark

Rungsted Kyst
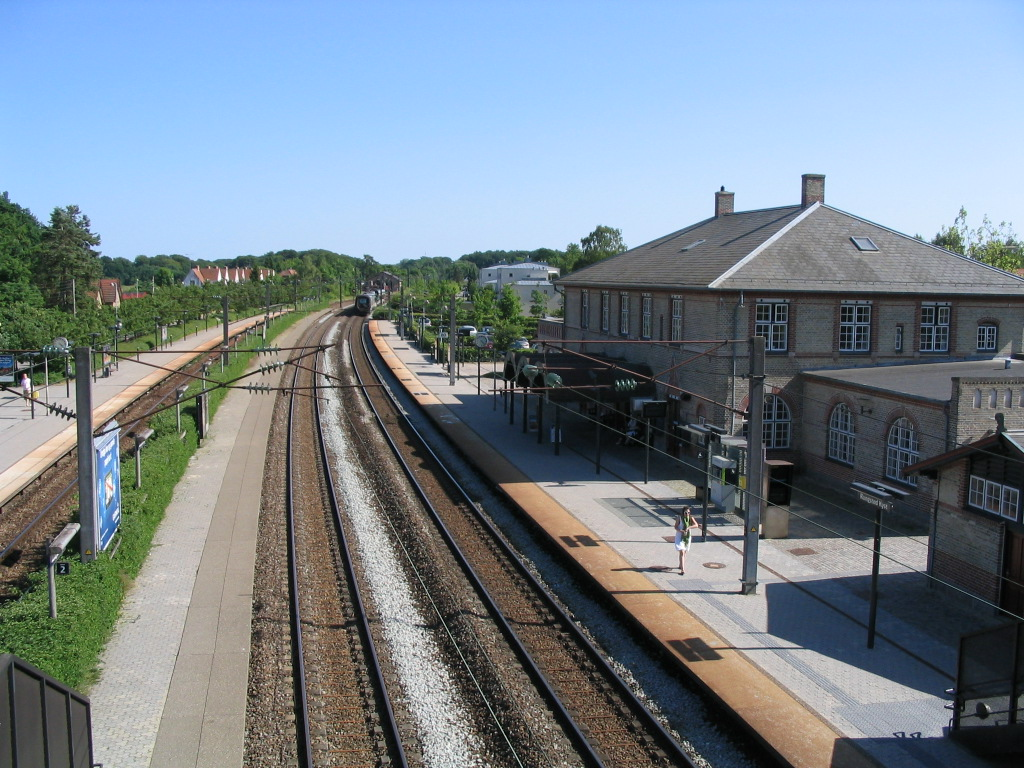
- Rungsted Kyst Station in 2008

General information
- Location: Vestre Stationsvej 7; 2960 Rungsted; Hørsholm Municipality; Denmark
- Coordinates: 55°52′56″N 12°31′54″E
- Elevation: 16.0 metres (52.5 ft)
- System: railway station
- Owner: DSB (station infrastructure); Banedanmark (rail infrastructure)
- Line: Coast Line
- Platforms: 3
- Tracks: 3
- Train operators: DSB

Services
Preceding station	DSB	Following station
Kokkedal towards Helsingør	Elsinore–Copenhagen– Roskilde–Holbæk Regional train	Vedbæk towards Holbæk
Kokkedal towards Helsingør	Elsinore–Copenhagen– Roskilde–Næstved Regional train	Vedbæk towards Næstved
Location
- Location within Denmark Location within Capital Region

Rungsted Kyst station (meaning literally "the coast of Rungsted") is a railway station serving the suburb of Rungsted on the coast of North Zealand north of Copenhagen, Denmark.

The station is located on the Coast Line between Helsingør and Copenhagen. The train services are currently operated by Danish State Railways (DSB).

Rungsted Kyst is famous due to a range of Danish celebrity who grew up in the area including Simon Spies, wealthy eccentric and airline director, and Karen Blixen, world-famous writer. Johannes Ewald, well known Danish poet and writer, wrote about his happy convalescing there.

== See also ==
- List of railway stations in Denmark
