= North Zealand =

North-east parts of Zealand

Map of North Zealand

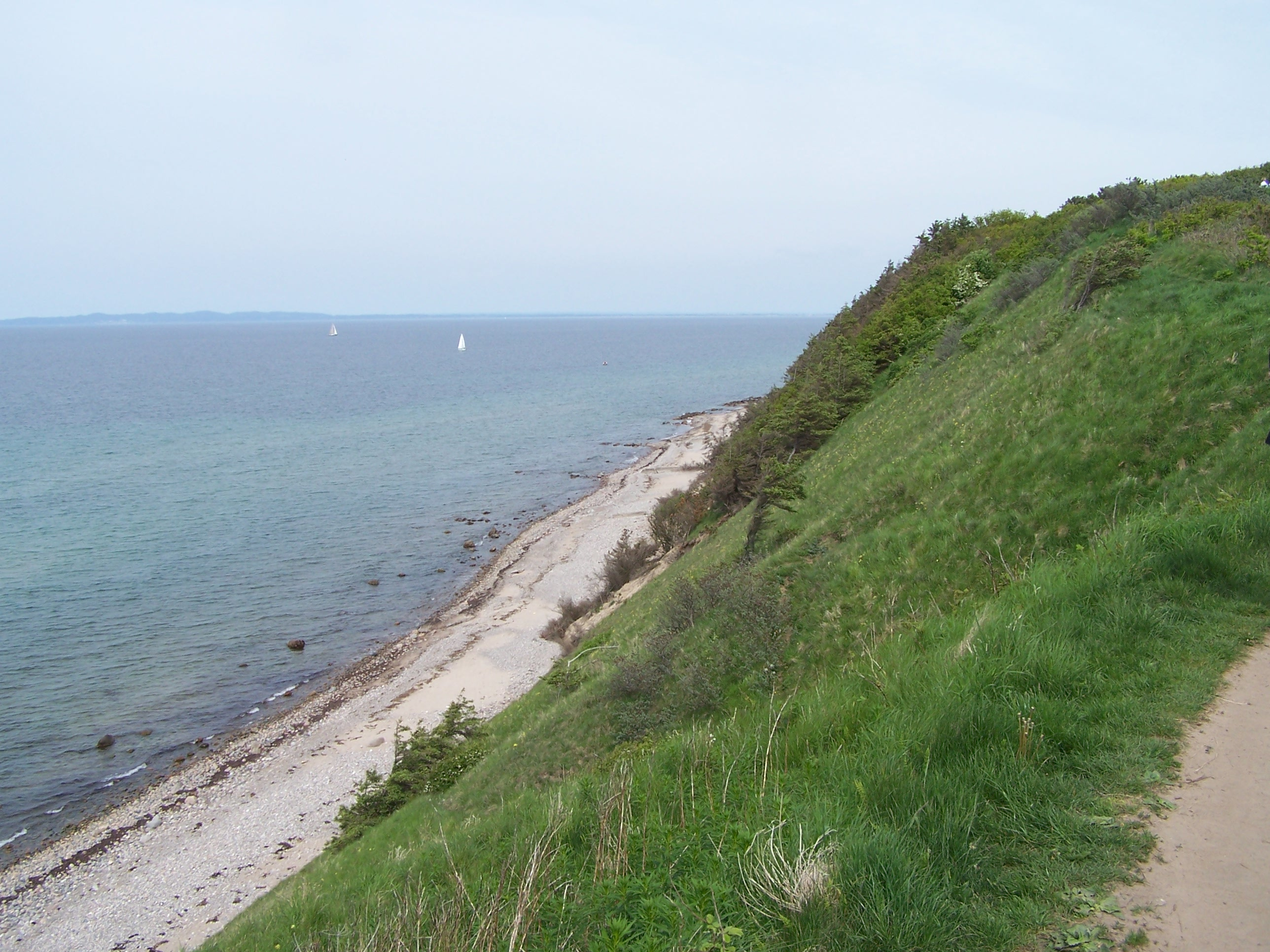
Coast near Gilleleje

North Zealand, also North Sealand (Danish: Nordsjælland), refers to the northeastern part of the Danish island of Zealand. The area has three royal castles and offers resorts with beaches, as well as lakes and forests. In addition to Kronborg Castle, three of the North Zealand forest areas used for royal par force hunting are included in the UNESCO World Heritage List.

The Danish tourist authorities have recently introduced the term Danish Riviera to cover the area in view of its increasing importance for tourism.

== Geographical coverage ==
The region has generally been understood to cover the area north of Greater Copenhagen between the Isefjord to the west and the Øresund to the east.

=== Municipalities ===
Since the Municipal reform of 2007, the region has been defined as comprising 11 municipalities: Allerød, Egedal, Fredensborg, Frederikssund, Furesø, Gribskov, Halsnæs, Helsingør, Hillerød, Hørsholm and Rudersdal.

=== Major towns and cities ===
The largest urban centres in the region are Helsingør (population 61,519), Hørsholm (46,229), Hillerød (31,181), Birkerød (20,041), Farum (18,335), Frederikssund (15,725) and Frederiksværk (12,029). The historic city of Roskilde (48,721) in the southwest is often included in North Zealand, especially in guide books.

Frederikssund, known for its Viking Games held each summer, is also adjacent to the Hornsherred peninsula with opportunities for walking, cycling and sailing. Jægerspris Castle with a history dating back to the 13th century is now a historic house museum.

Frederiksværk owes its existence to its industrial past including its cannon factory established in 1761 by Johan Frederik Classen in accordance with the wishes of King Frederik V. Gjethuset, part of the old factory, has now been converted into a cultural centre. Another attraction is the open-air Gunpowder Museum (Krudtværksmuseet).

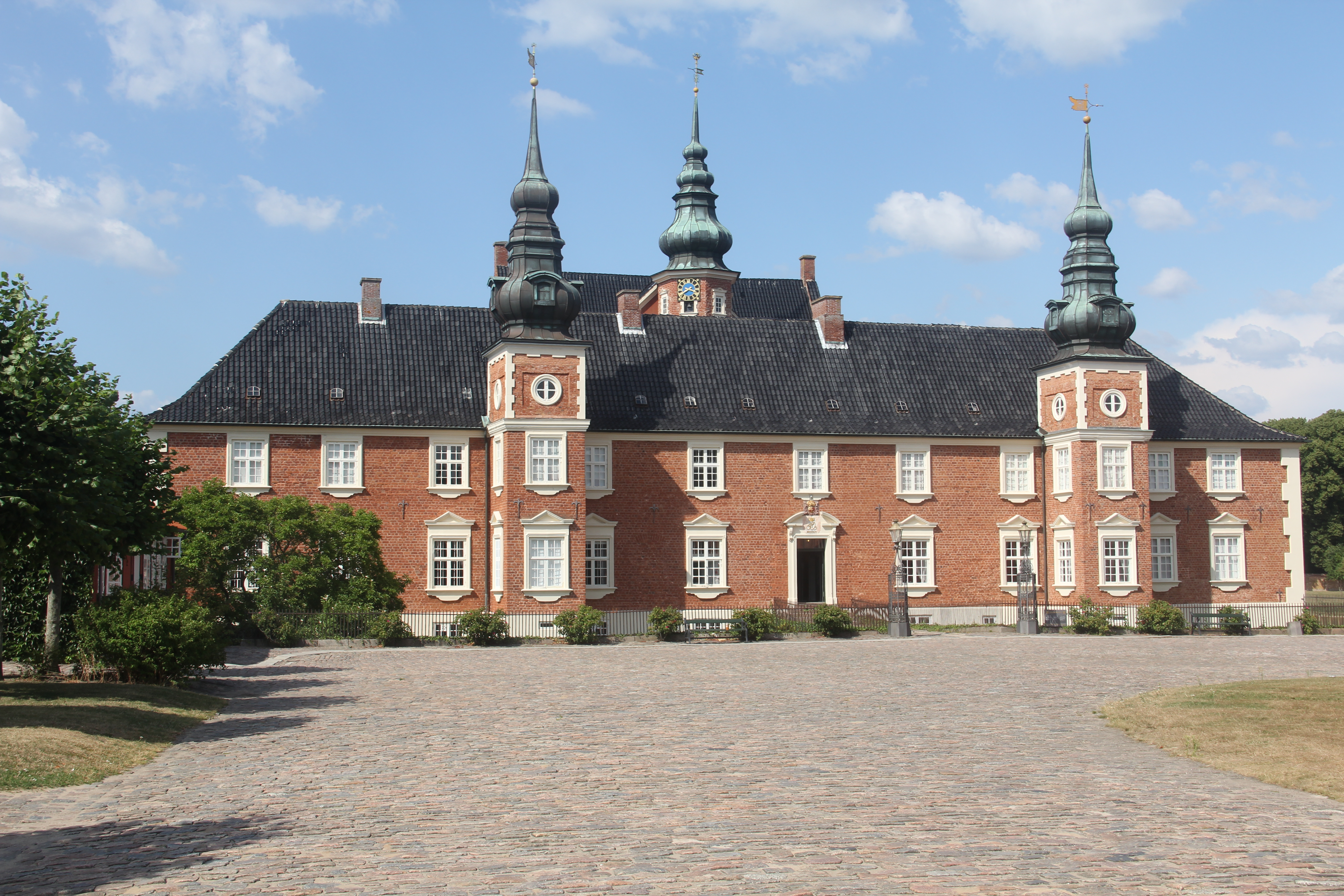
Jægerspris Castle

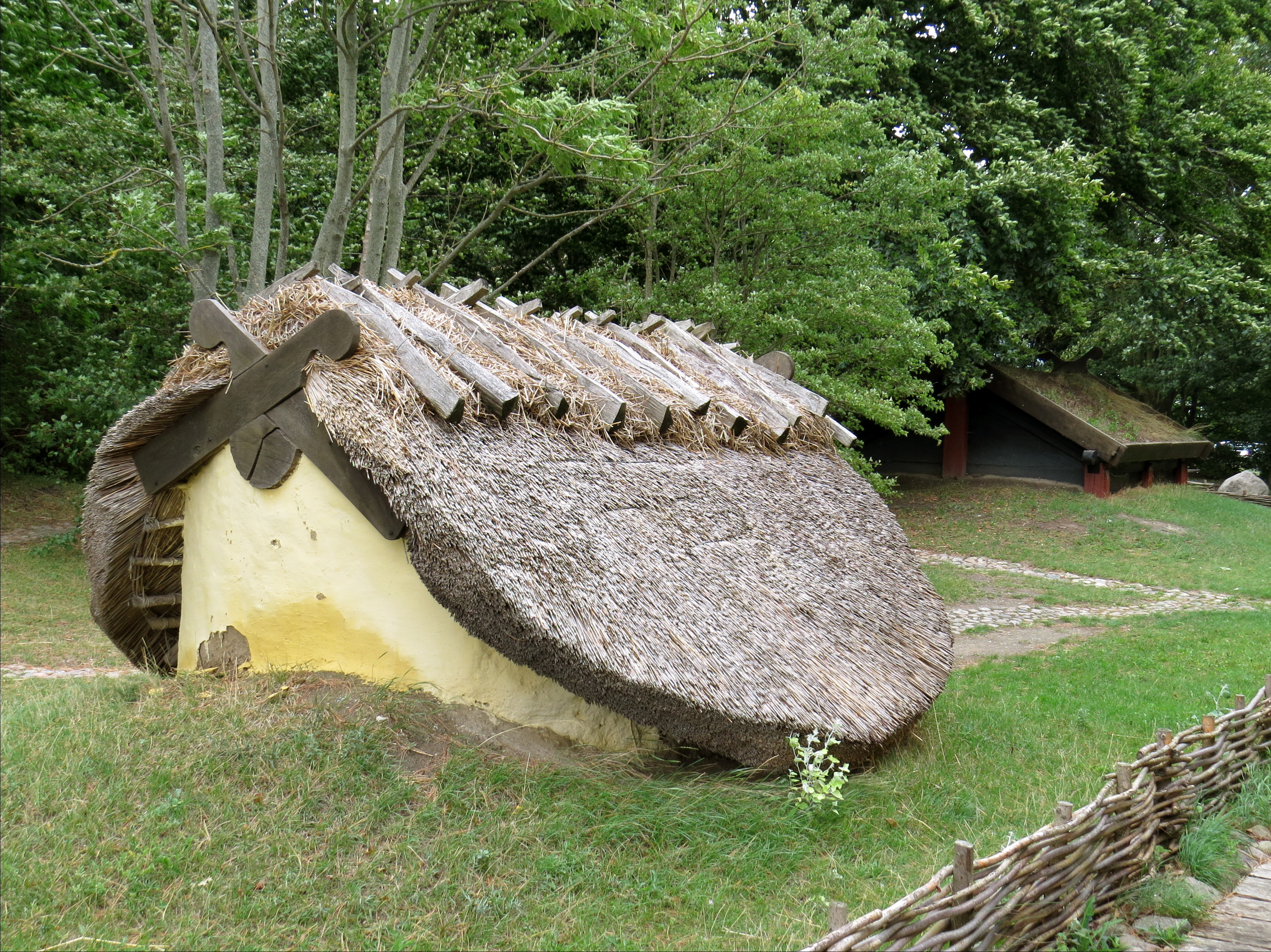
Viking hut, Frederikssund

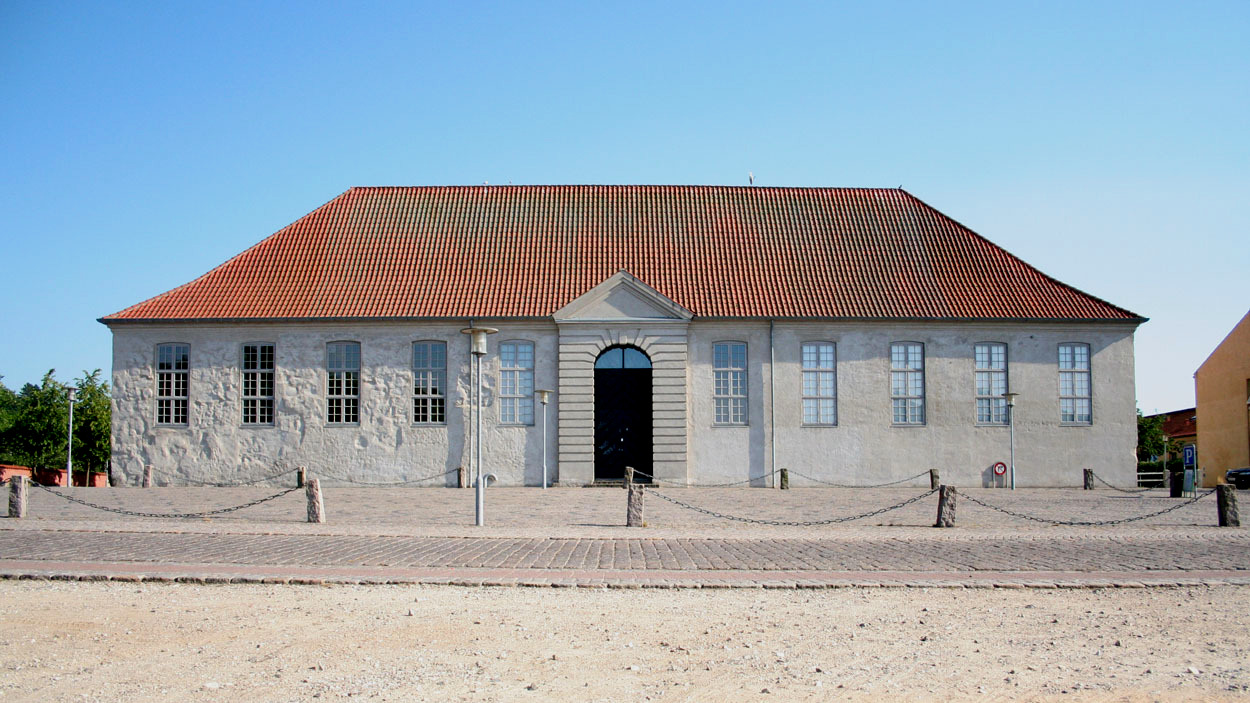
Gjethuset, Frederiksværk

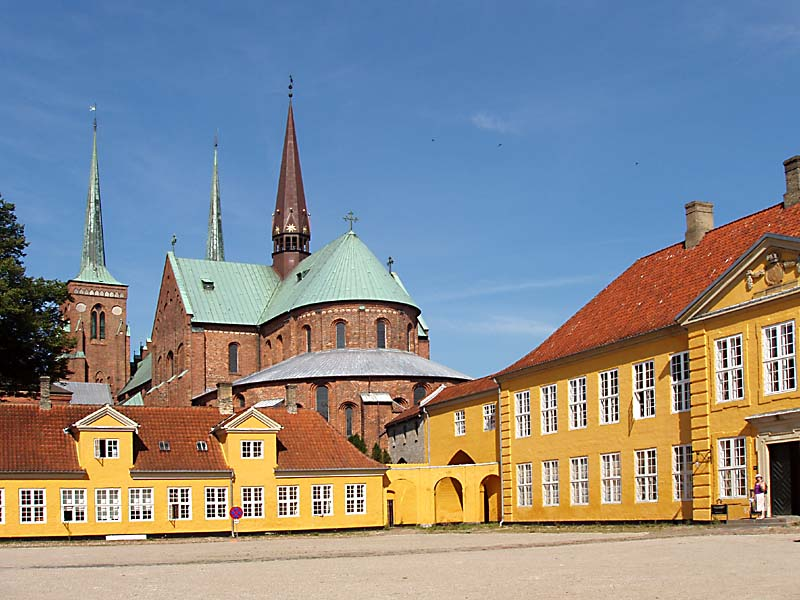
Roskilde Cathedral

== History ==
The region has a history dating back at least to the 13th century as in 1231 Helsingør was mentioned in Valdemar's Census Book before obtaining privileges as a market town under Eric of Pomerania in 1426. The castle known as Krogen was rebuilt as Kronborg in 1577. From the Danish Reformation in 1536, the monarchy confiscated the extensive estates in North Zealand which had belonged to the monasteries gaining ownership of most of the region until the beginning of the 18th century. They did not use the land for farming, however, but mainly for hunting and for grazing their horses. They also established enclosed parks for hunting deer.

Since the 16th century, royal residences and palaces have been built in the region. In the 18th century, Frederiksværk on the west coast and Hellebæk just west of Helsingør, became important industrial centres thanks to the early manufacture of armaments.

From the turn of the 20th century, the north and east coasts have developed as bathing and holiday resorts for the inhabitants of Copenhagen. The area to the north of the capital has become popular as a well-to-do residential and recreational area for those working in the city.

== Attractions and landmarks ==
=== Royal castles ===
One of the major attractions in the area is the UNESCO-listed Kronborg Castle in Helsingør to the north-east. It is not only the site of William Shakespeare's play Hamlet but is one of the most important Renaissance castles in northern Europe. The lively city of Helsingør also has a cathedral church built in the 16th century. Its redeveloped harbour area known as Kulturhavn Kronborg now houses the Danish Maritime Museum while Kulturværftet is a large venue for concerts and exhibitions.

The second largest city Hillerød, in the centre of the region, is famous for Frederiksborg Palace built in the Renaissance style for Christian IV in the early 17th century. The city is not only a tourist attraction but a thriving industrial centre thanks to a number of recently established firms in the biotechnology sector.

Fredensborg Palace, another royal castle, was built by Frederick IV in 1722 in the Baroque style and was extended later in the 18th century. As the palace is one of the royal family's official residences, it is not open to the public. The palace gardens may however be visited.

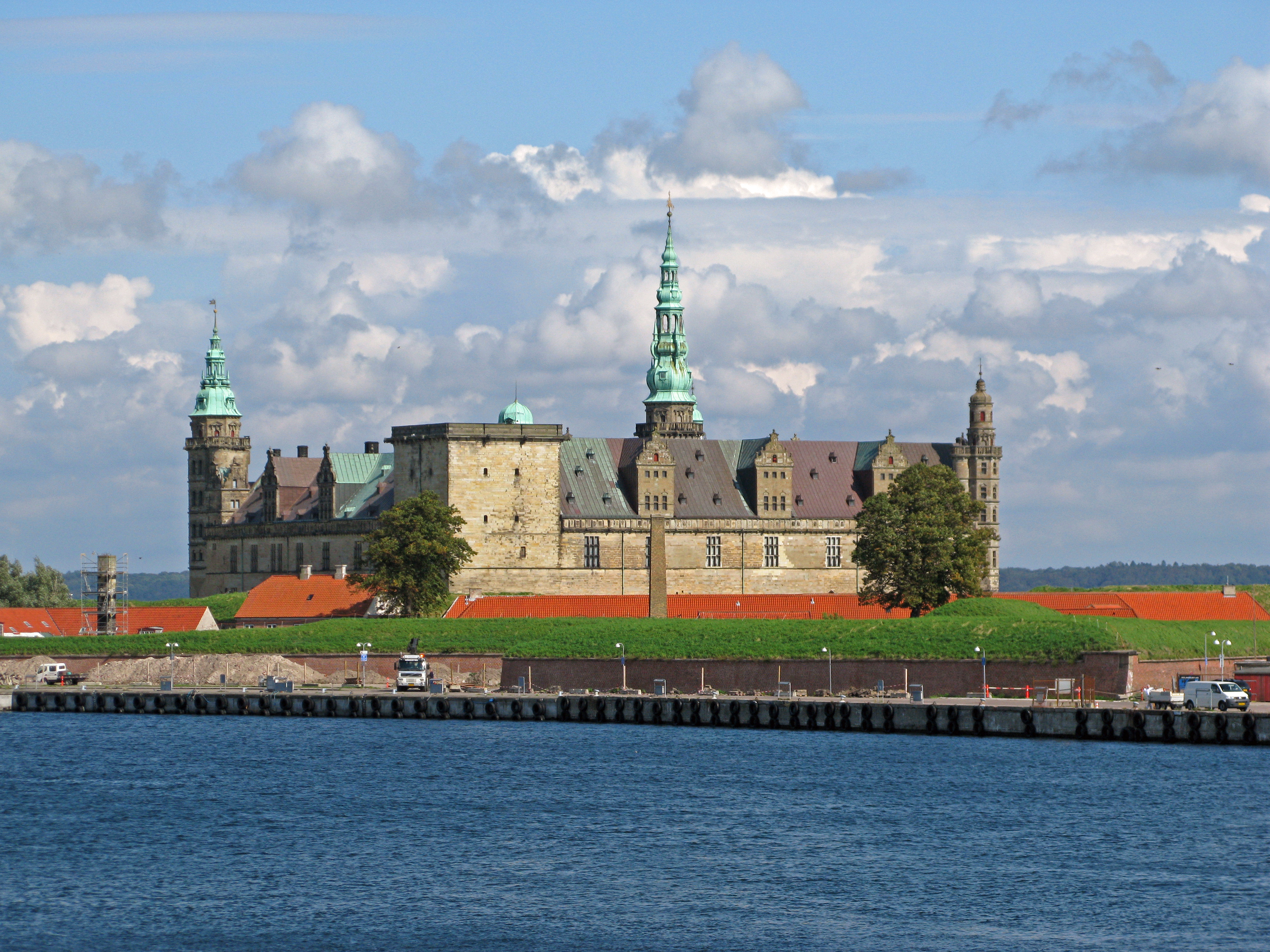
Kronborg, Helsingør (UNESCO-listed)

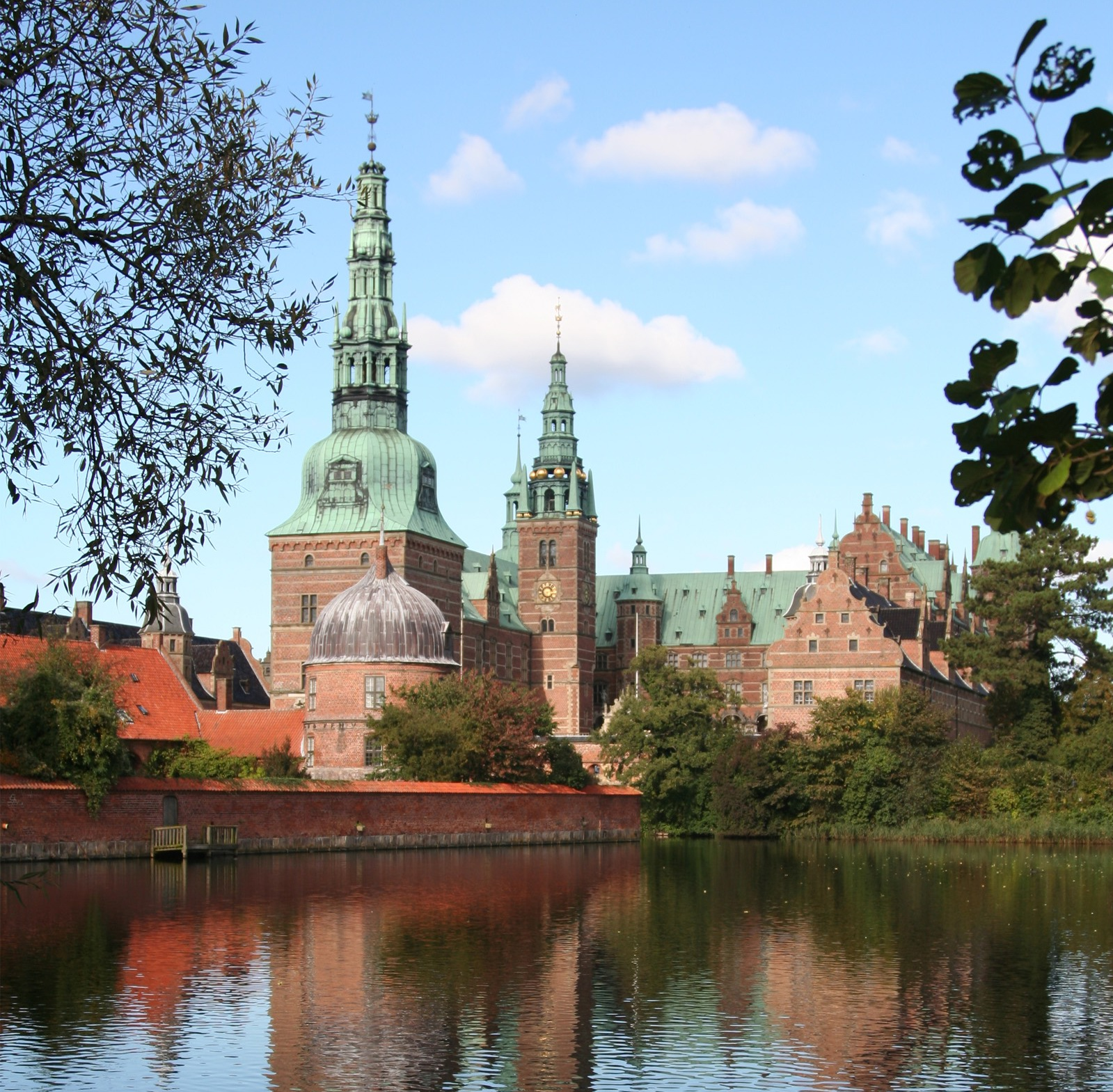
Frederiksborg, Hillerød

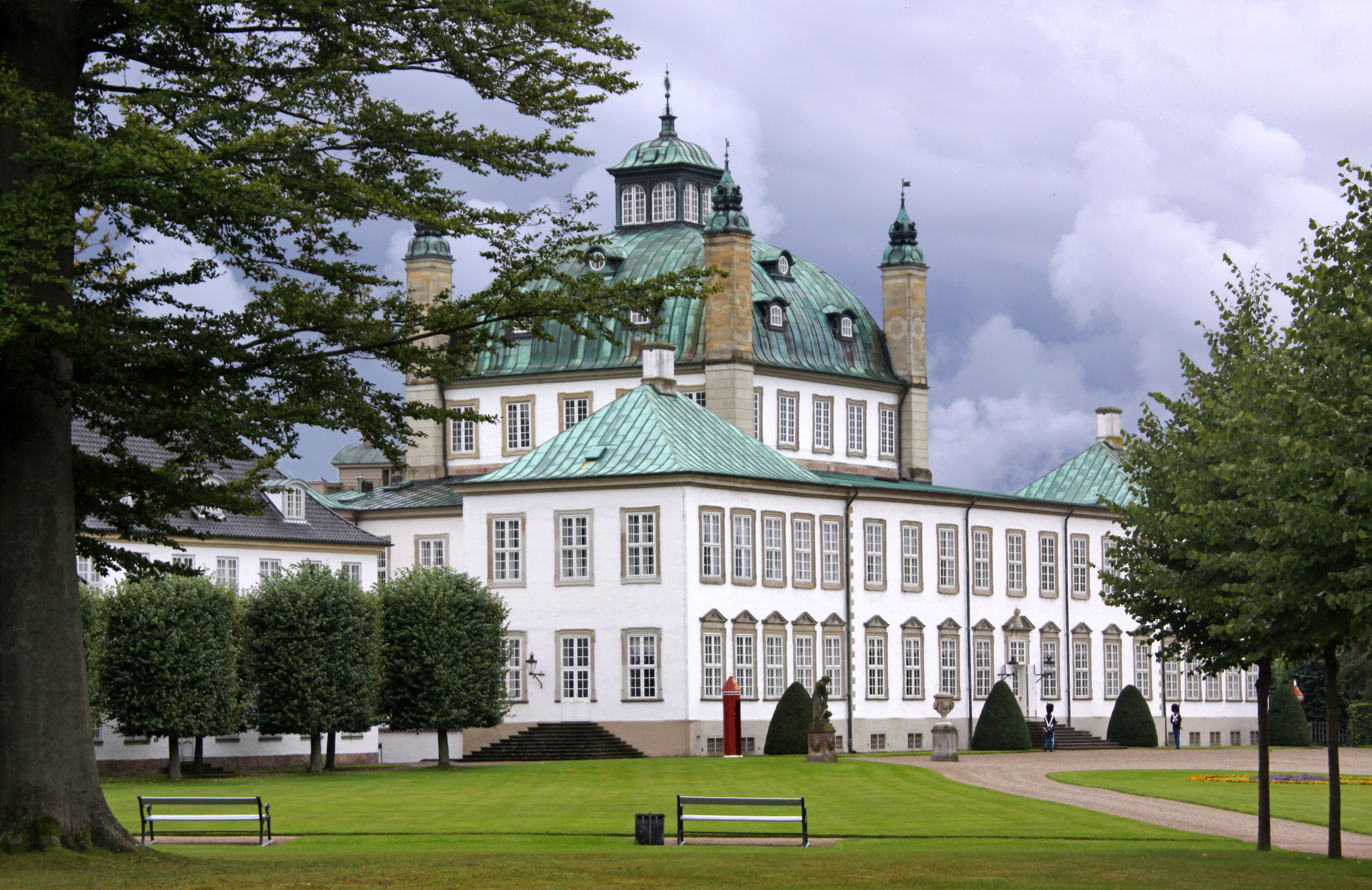
Fredensborg Palace

=== Museums and heritage sites ===
The Louisiana Museum of Modern Art in Humlebæk to the south of Helsingør is Denmark's most popular art museum. Created in 1958, it has a large permanent collection of paintings and sculptures from the mid-20th century to the present. Rungstedlund, also known at the Karen Blixen Museum, is a country house on the east coast which has been preserved to present the house in which the renowned Danish writer Karen Blixen, author of Out of Africa, lived until her death in 1962. It opened as a museum in 1991.

The Danish Museum of Science and Technology (Danmarks Tekniske Museum) in Helsingør has a wide variety of attractions for both adults and children including steam engines, veteran cars and electricity. The J.F. Willumsens Museum in Frederikssund to the southwest is an art museum dedicated to the works of the Symbolist artist Jens Ferdinand Willumsen (1863-1958) which was opened in 1957. The remaining buildings of 12th-century Esrum Abbey near Hillerød were listed as a heritage site in 1992. After restoration, one of the buildings was opened as a museum in 1997 with a permanent collection as well as facilities for temporary exhibitions and events such as concerts and presentations. The Rudolph Tegner Museum in Dronningmølle on the north coast presents the works of the Symbolist sculptor Rudolph Tegner (1873-1950) in an unusual concrete, bunker-like building with an octagonal gallery 11 metres in height. The surrounding park displays 14 statues created by Tegner.

The Danish Museum of Hunting and Forestry in Hørsholm hosted an exhibition about the UNESCO-listed Par force hunting landscape in North Zealand heritage site. A special exhibition was devoted to the listing in October 2015. However, after the Danish Museum of Hunting and Forestry closed on January 1, 2017 the management of the heritage site moved to Museum North Zealand.

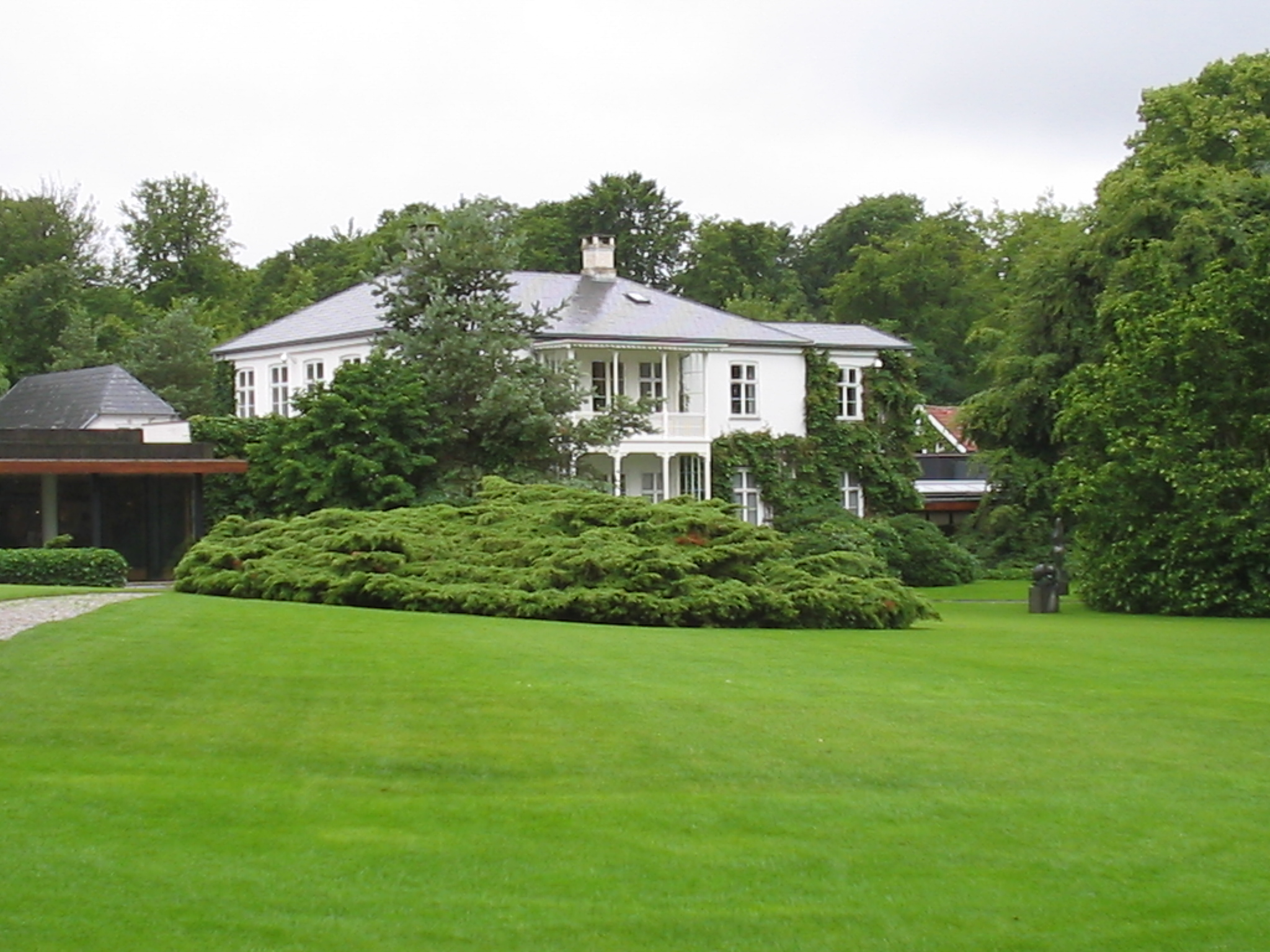
Louisiana Museum

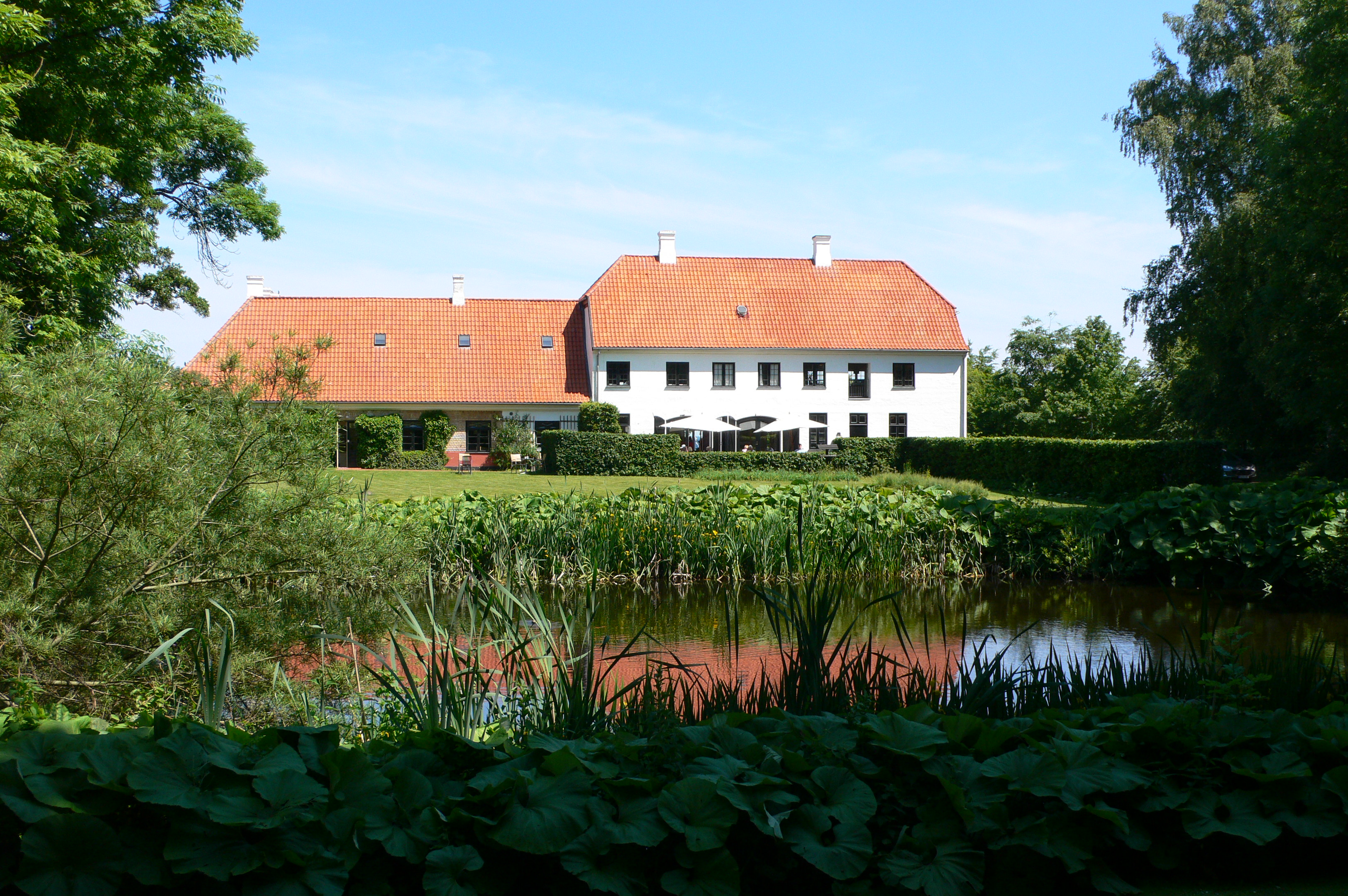
Rungstedlund

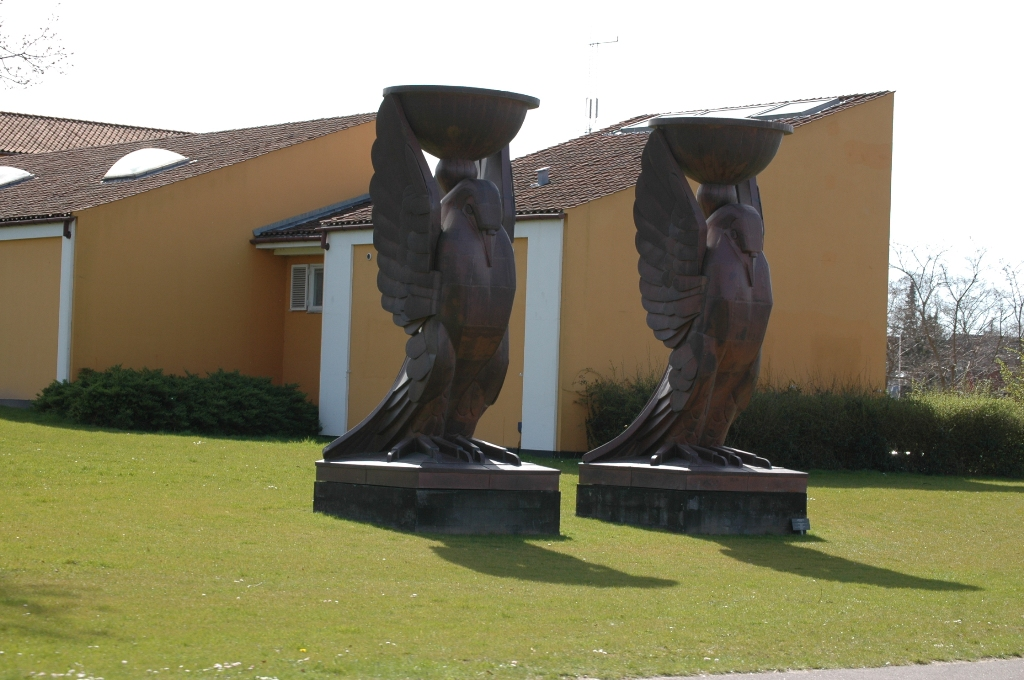
J.F. Willumsen Museum

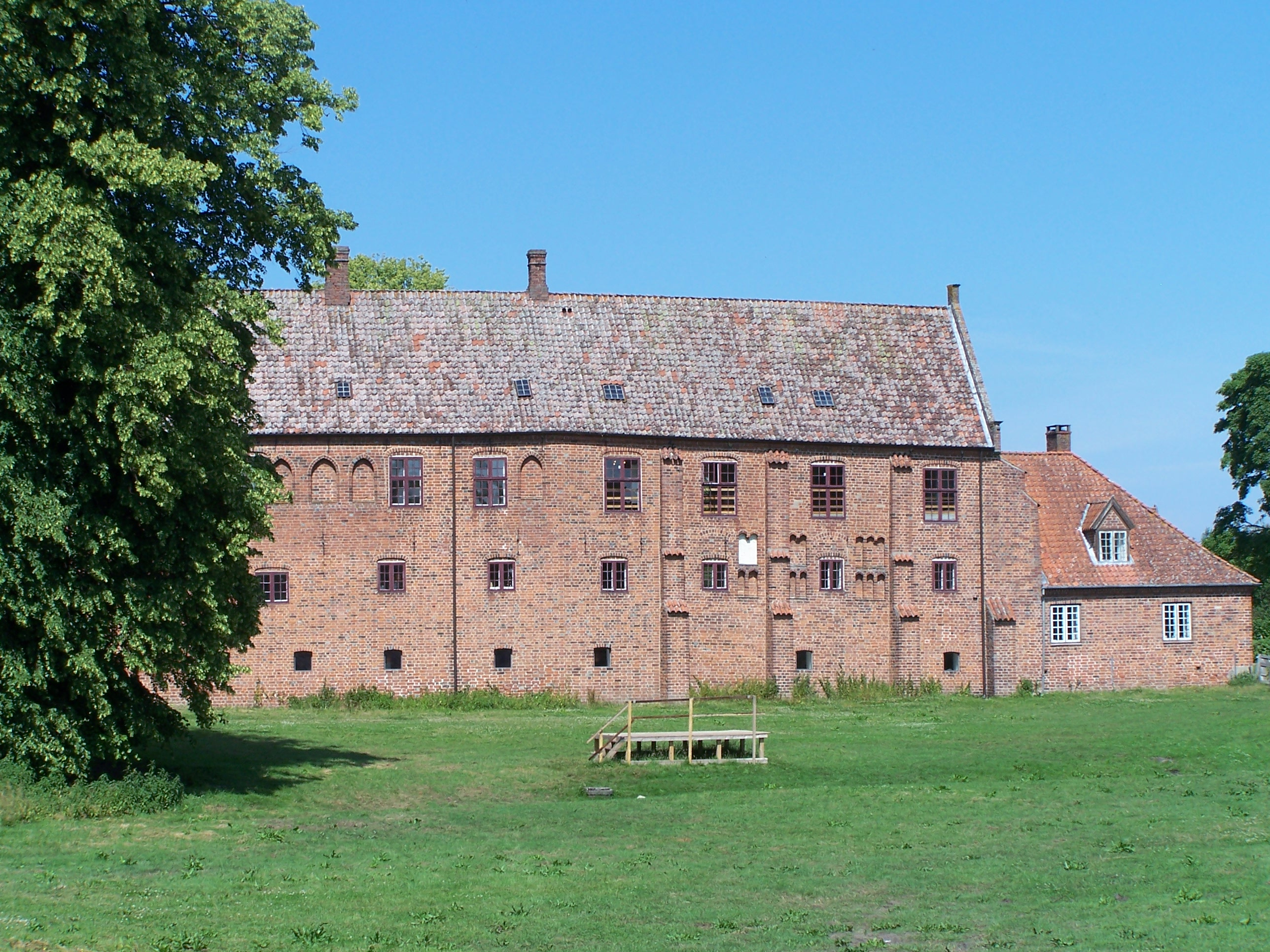
Esrum Abbey

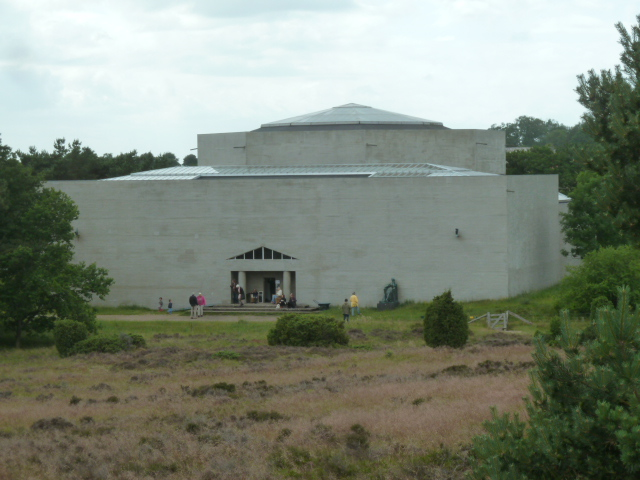
Rudolph Tegner Museum

=== Fishing villages and seaside resorts ===
All around the North Zealand coast there are interesting fishing villages, many of which have developed as seaside resorts with facilities for tourists. One of the most popular is Hornbæk, 12 km northwest of Helsingør, with its large sandy beaches, marina, cafés and restaurants, and a large area devoted to summer houses. Helsingør and Hornbæk in particular have a number of notable hotels including the 158-room Hotel & Casino Marienlyst and 28-room townhouse Hotel Skandia in Helsingør, and the Havreholm Slot and Sauntehus Slotshotel palacial hotels in the municipality of Hornbæk, the latter of which was built as a home by a wealthy corn merchant in 1914.

Some 12 km to the northwest is Gilleleje, Zealand's most northernmost point, which has grown from a little village in 1900 to a popular coastal resort with sandy beaches, an active fishing harbour and several museums. The beach at Dronningmølle between Hornbæk and Gilleleje has also led to a large summer house district stretching 2 km inland. The Rudolph Tegner Museum displaying the artist's modern sculptural works is nearby.

Rågeleje, 10 km southwest of Gilleleje, is a little fishing village with a history dating back to the 16th century. There are two sandy beaches, one on each side of the stream that runs through the village. Tisvilde, 9 km southwest of Rågeleje, is a small town which since the Second World War has grown into another popular location for summer houses, thanks to its sandy beach at Tisvildeleje to the south and its chalk cliffs to the north. The heathery hills of Tibirke Bakker to the south of Tisvilde offer excellent views of the surroundings from a height of 57 m (187 ft). Further south, the last resort on the northwest coast is Liseleje, some 8 km north of Frederiksværk. It has also developed into a large summer house area. The recently completed natural playground Havtyren, with a variety of open-air challenges, is a popular attraction for children.

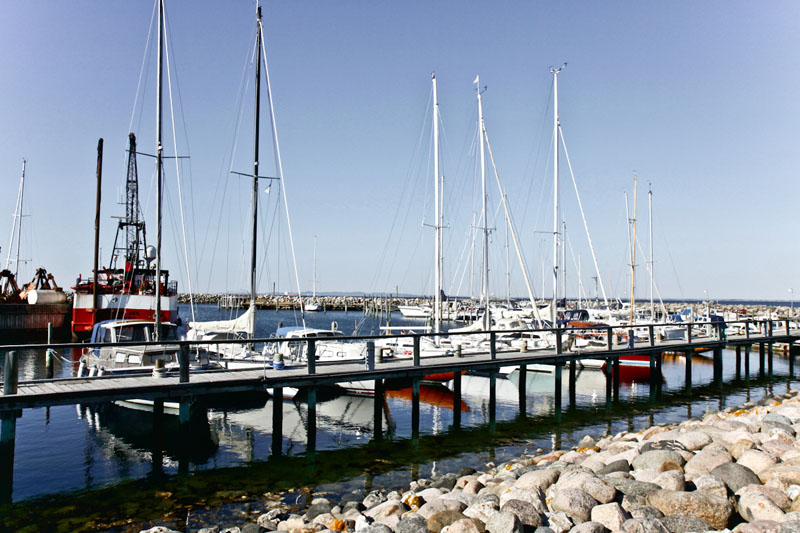
Hornbæk Marina

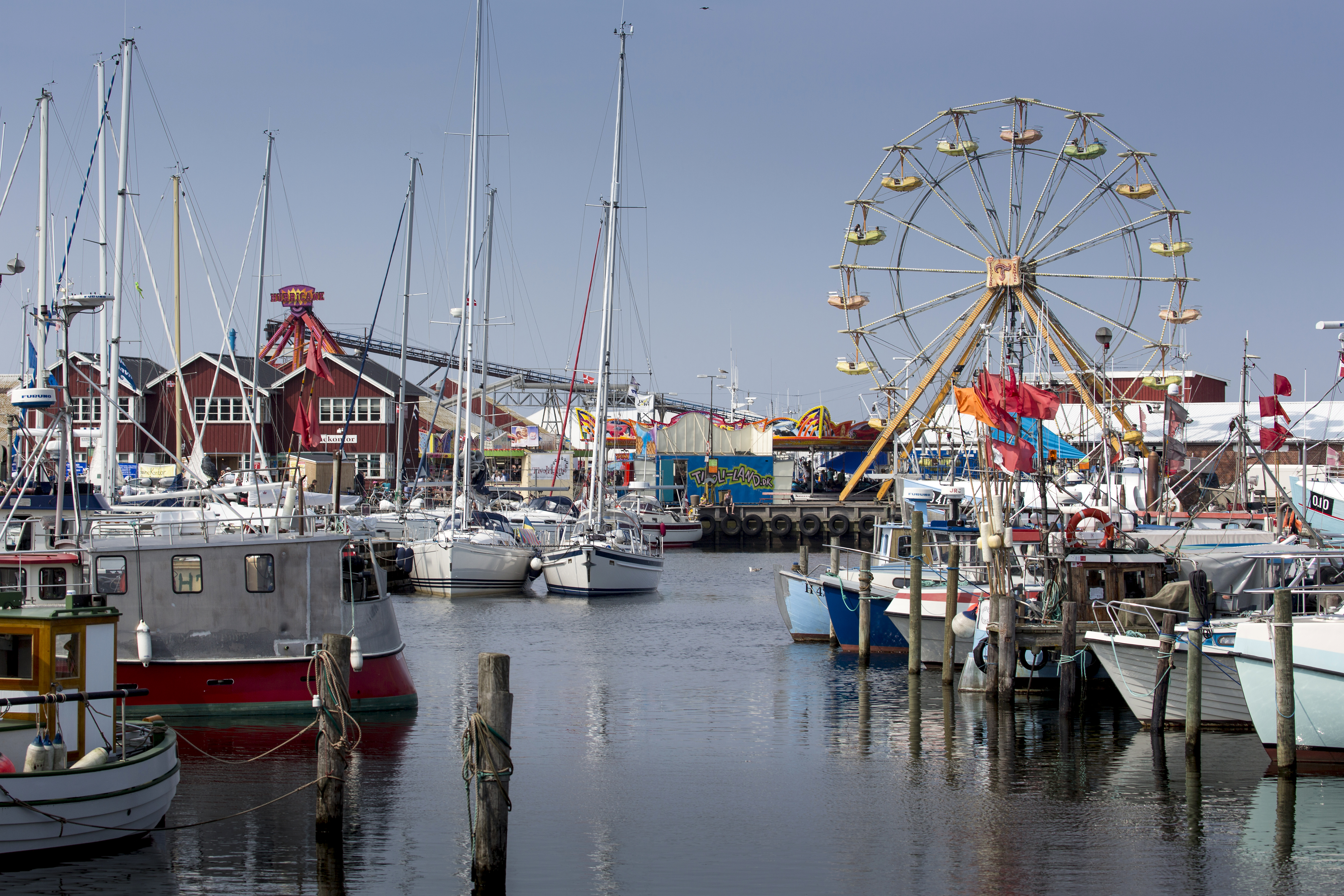
Gilleleje

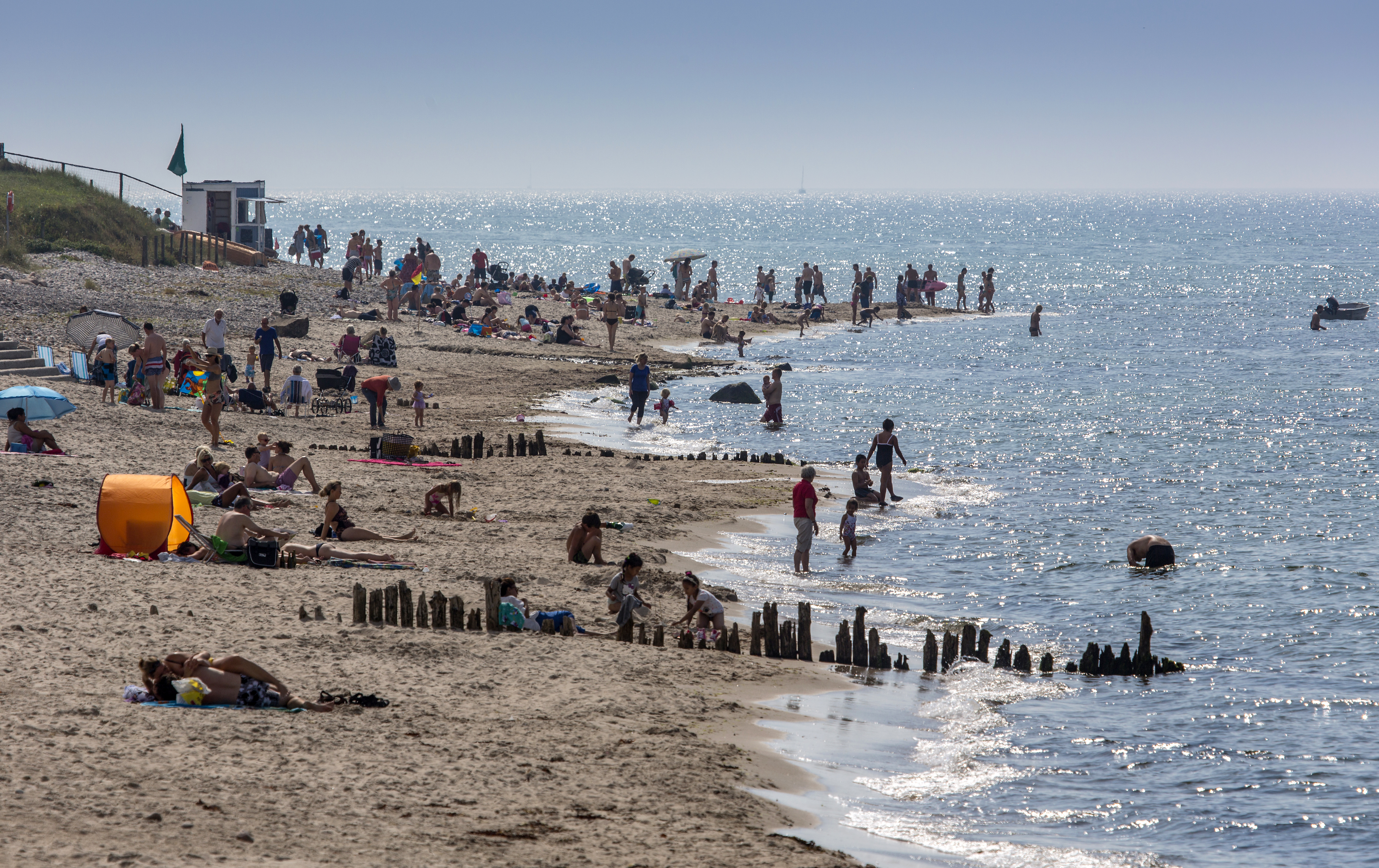
Rågeleje Beach

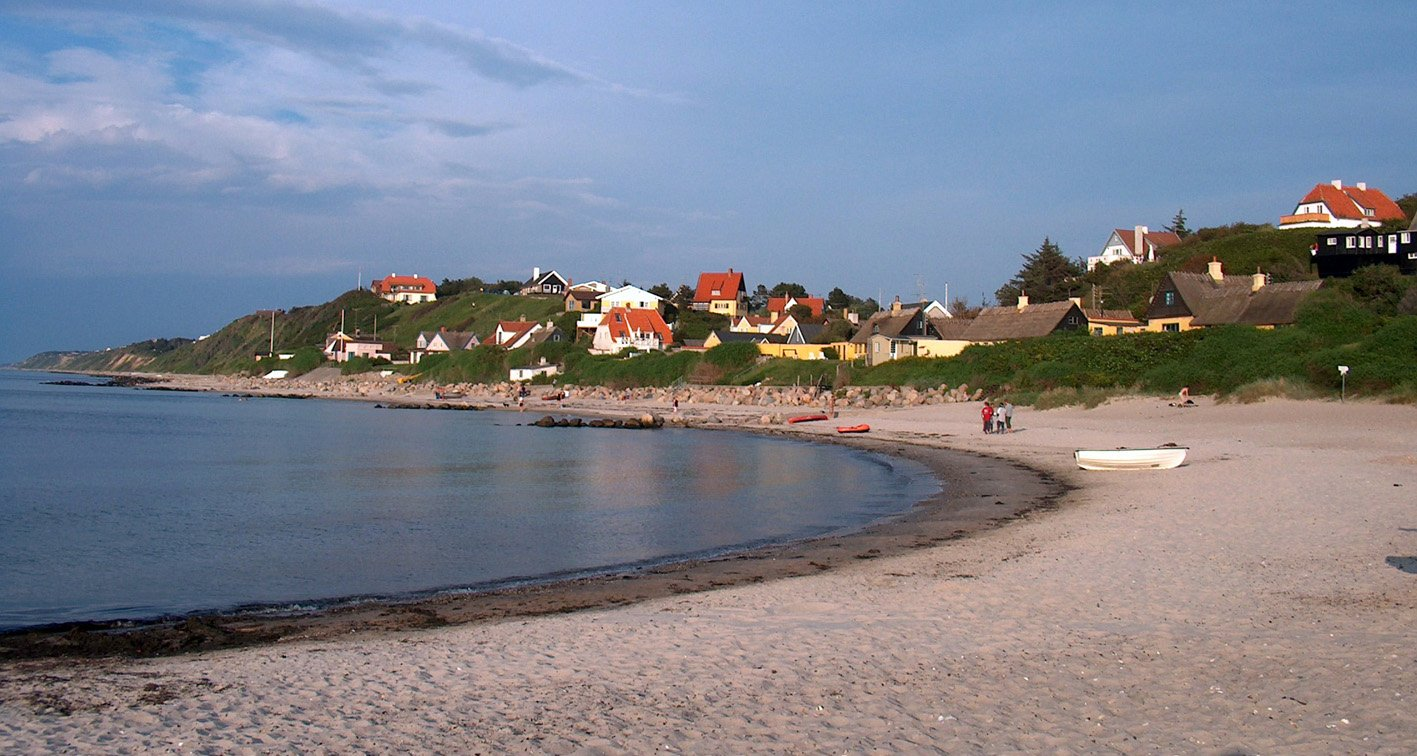
Tisvildeleje

=== Strandvejen ===
Strandvejen, also Kystvejen, is the coast road along the Øresund connecting Hellerup in the south to Helsingør in the north. It passes through several former fishing villages with exclusive villas built by Copenhagen's more prosperous inhabitants. The development of the coastal villages into residential areas was mainly a result of the inauguration of the Kystbanen railway in 1897.

Bellevue Beach on the northern outskirts of Copenhagen not only has a long sandy beach but is famous for the Bellavista housing estate, the Bellevue Theatre and bathing cabins designed by the Danish architect and designer Arne Jacobsen in the early 1930s. Other places of interest on the road to Helsingør include: Rungsted with exclusive villas, a marina and Karen Blixen's Rungstedlund; Nivå with a coastal park, small harbour and the Nivaagaard art gallery; Humlebæk, an old fishing village now famous for the modern art museum Louisiana; and, just south of Helsingør, Snekkersten with its harbour and hotels.

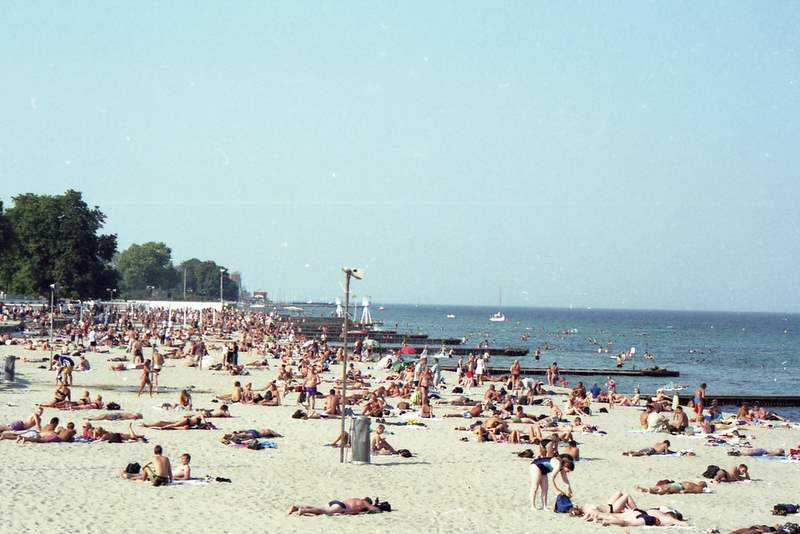
Bellevue Beach

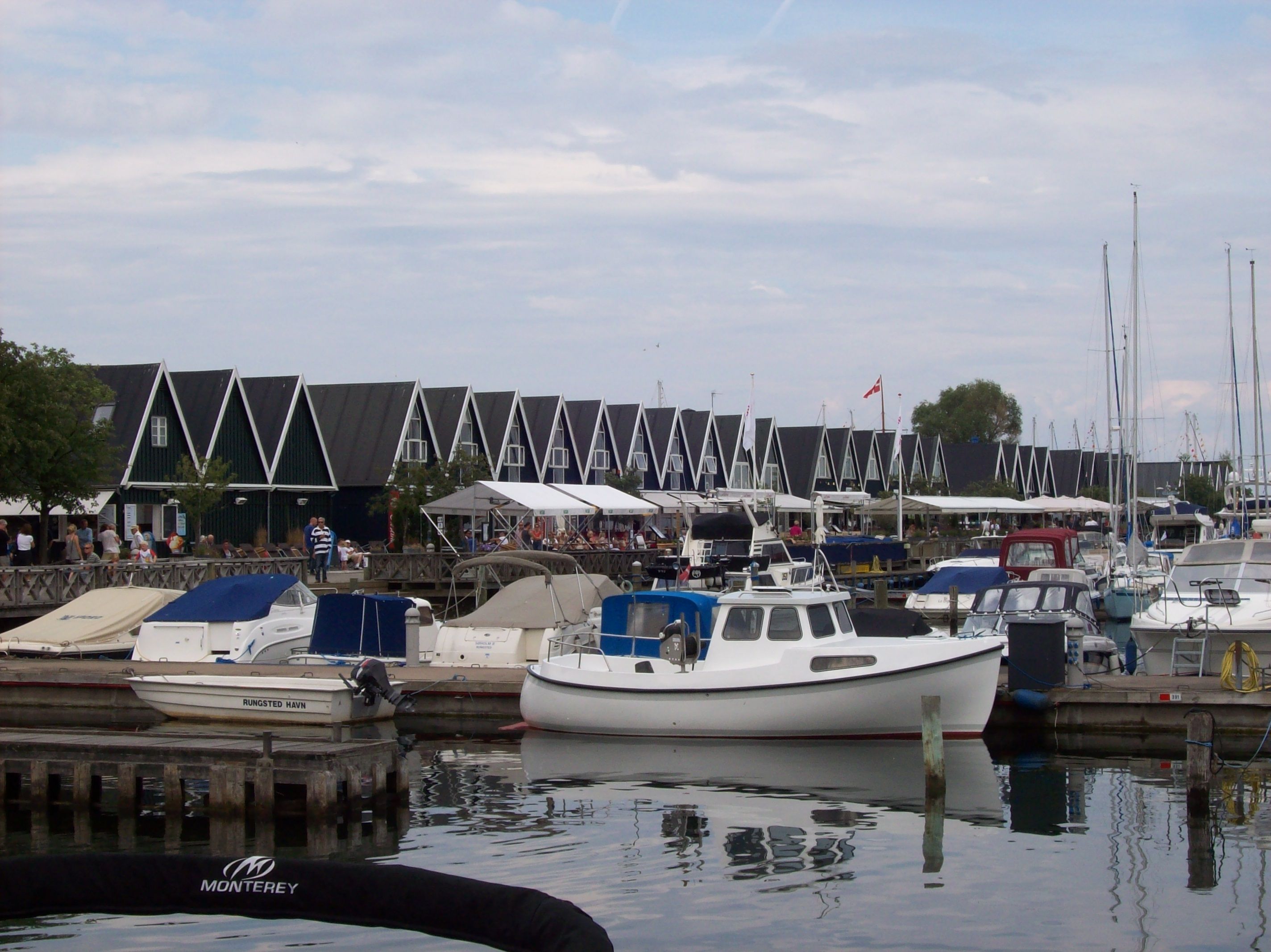
Rungsted Marina

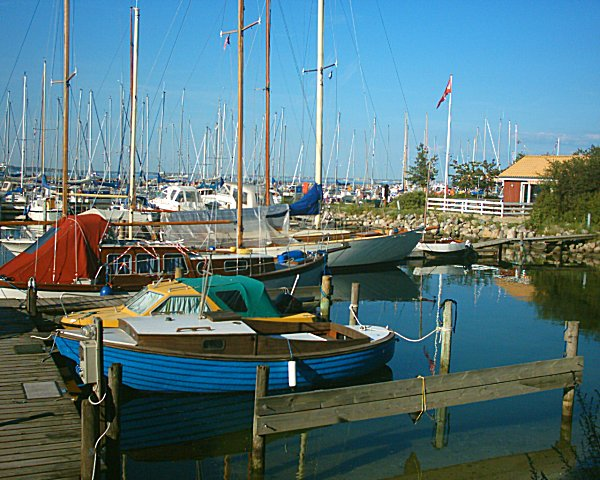
Nivå Harbour

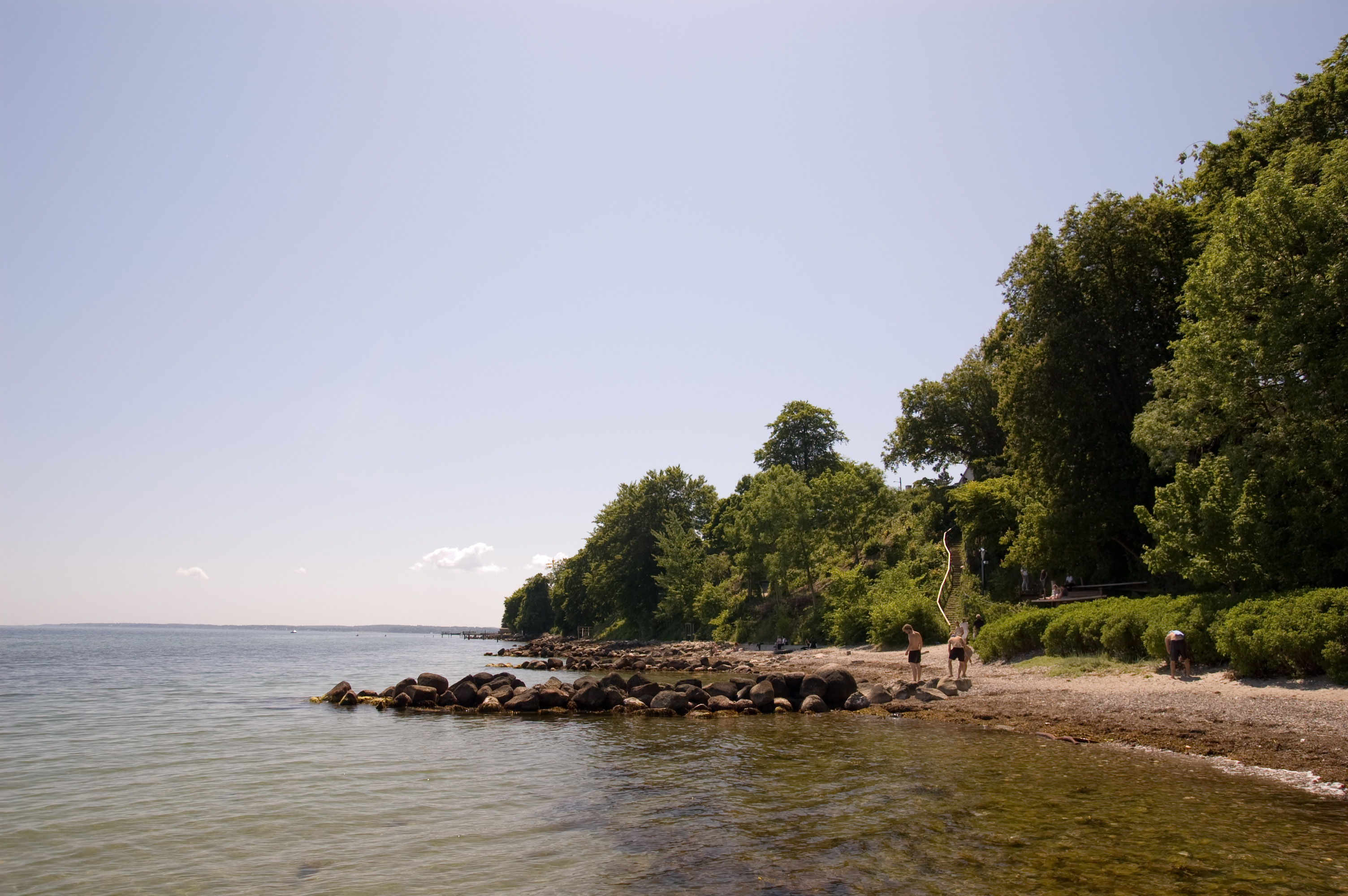
Coast near Humlebæk

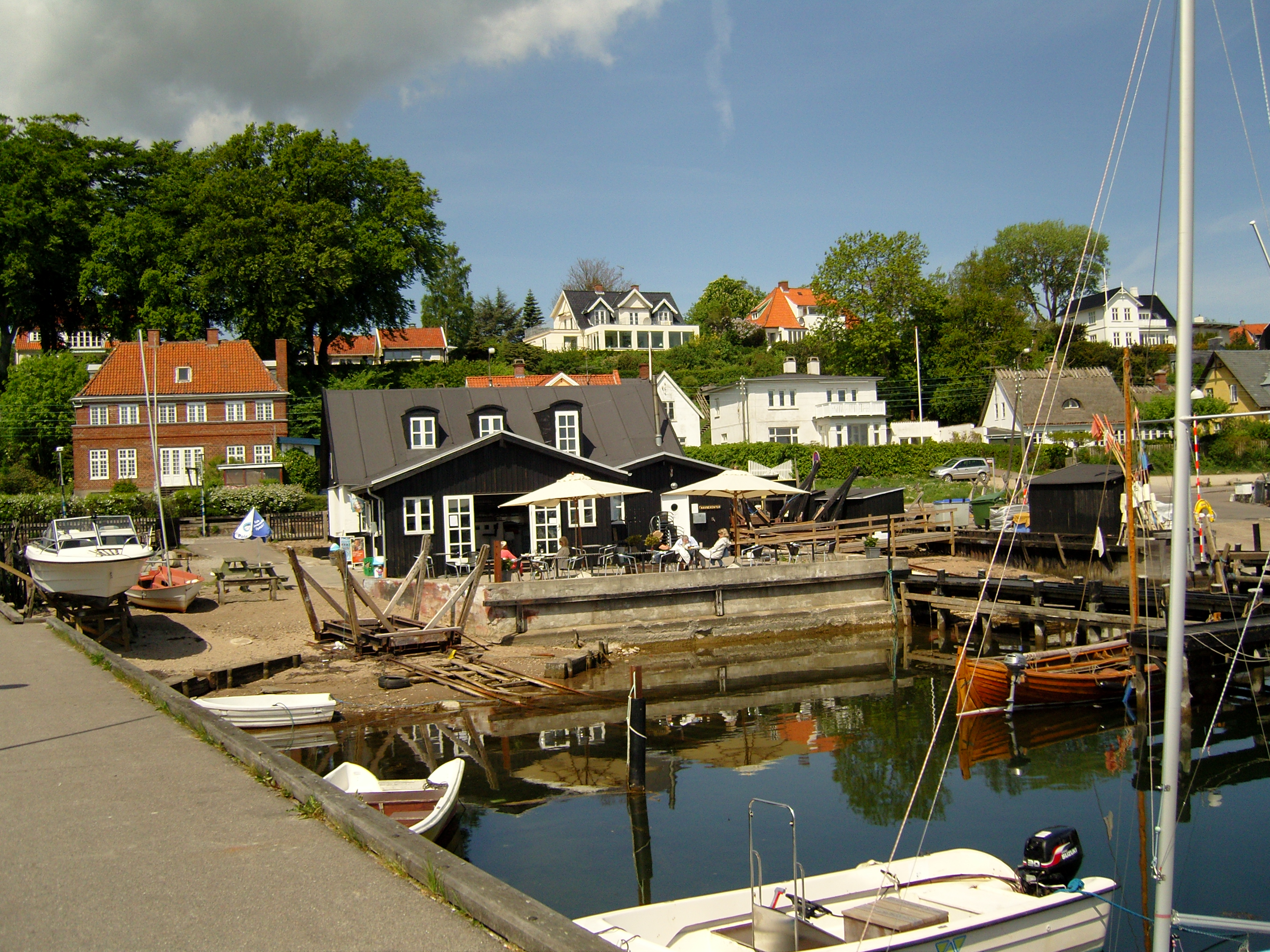
Snekkersten

== Lakes and forests ==
North Zealand has two large lakes, Arresø to the east of Frederiksværk and Esrum Sø to the west of Fredensborg. With an area of 40.72 km^{2} (15.72 sq mi), Arresø, Denmark's largest lake, is open for fishing but not for bathing. Rowing boats, but not motor boats, are allowed. In addition to several signposted walks in the area, there are plans to open hiking and cycling paths all the way around the lake. Esrum Sø, covering 17.3 km^{2} (6.7 sq mi), is rich in bird life and has a bird reservation with observation towers at the southern end. Amateur fishing is permitted in the lake's pollution-free waters. Boating in canoes, rowing boats, wind-surfers and yachts (up to 7 metres long and 2.5 metres wide) is allowed. Boats with electric motors are permitted but diesel motors require special authorization. Swimming and diving are also permitted.

As for woodlands, Gribskov to the west of Esrum Sø is Denmark's oldest forest with the country's largest herd of deer. There are interesting signposted walks which include the forest's megalithic passage graves, long barrows and dolmens. By contrast, Tisvilde Hegn, close to the northwest coast, was planted in the 19th century with Scots pine to combat drifting sands which had invaded the area. It has now developed into an area noted for its flora and fauna, especially its birdlife.

In 2015, UNESCO included "The par force hunting landscape in North Zealand" as a World Heritage Site. The site specifically includes the mathematically-designed road systems developed in the 1680s under Christian V of Denmark in Gribskov and Store Dyrehave to facilitate deer hunting with hounds as well as Jægersborg Dyrehave.

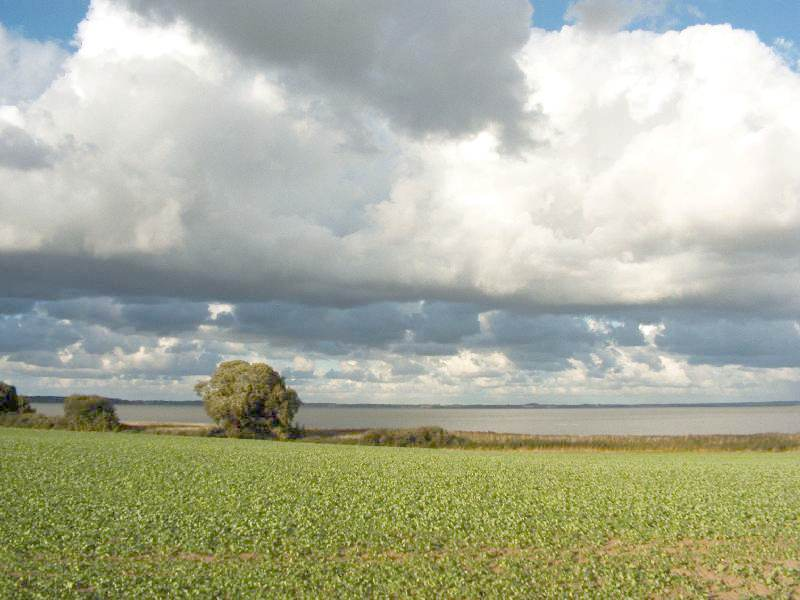
Arresø

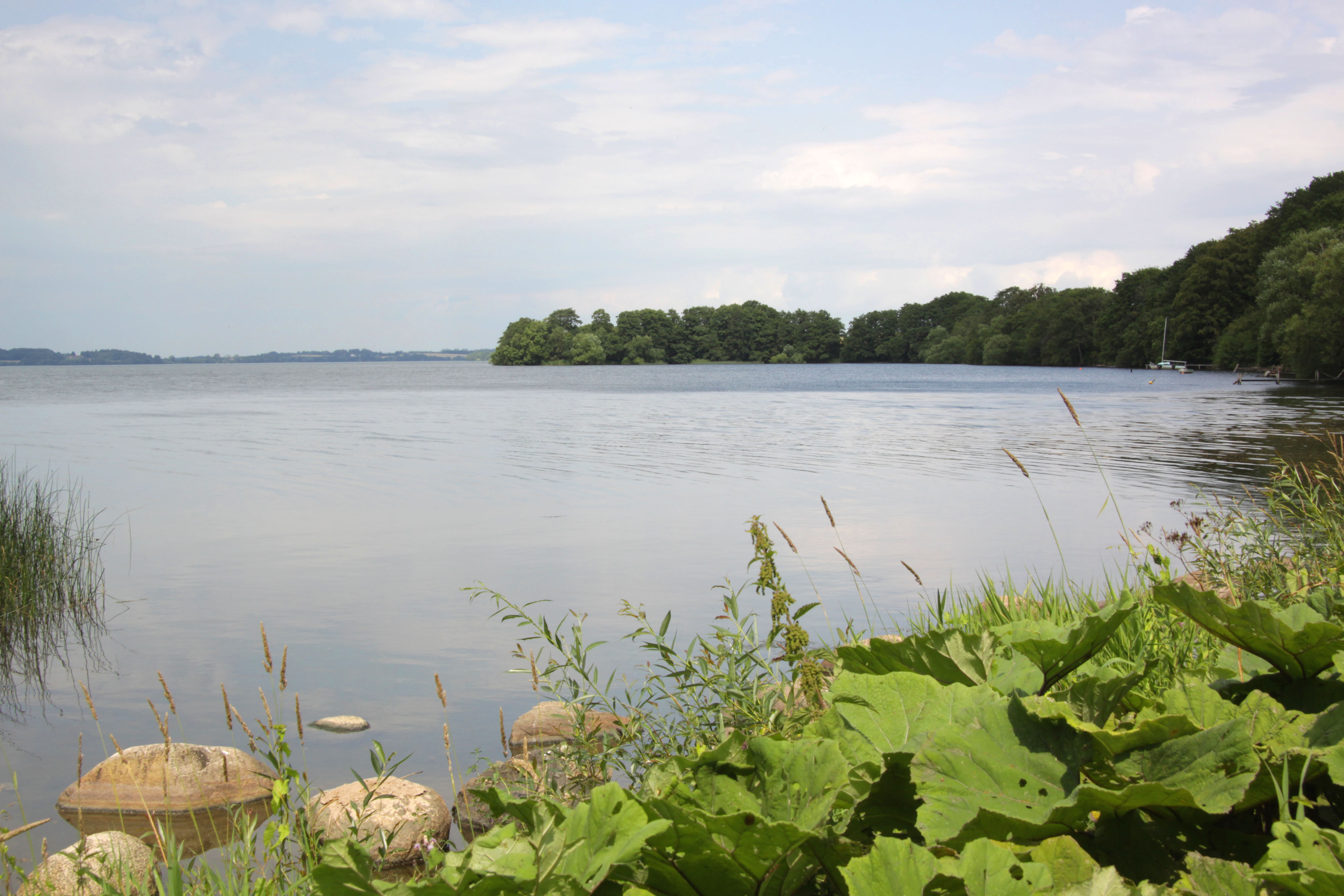
Esrum Sø

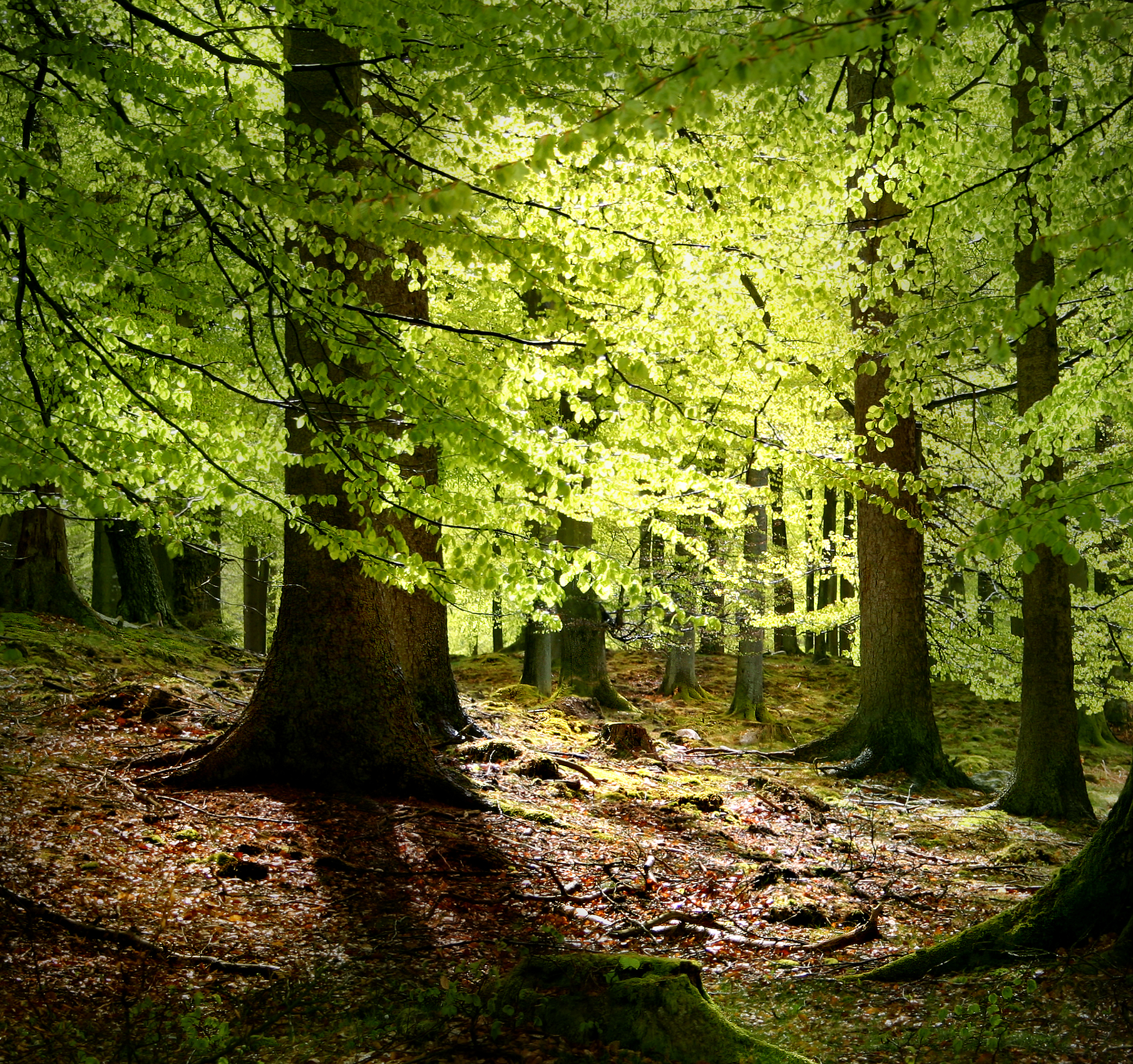
Gribskov (UNESCO-listed)

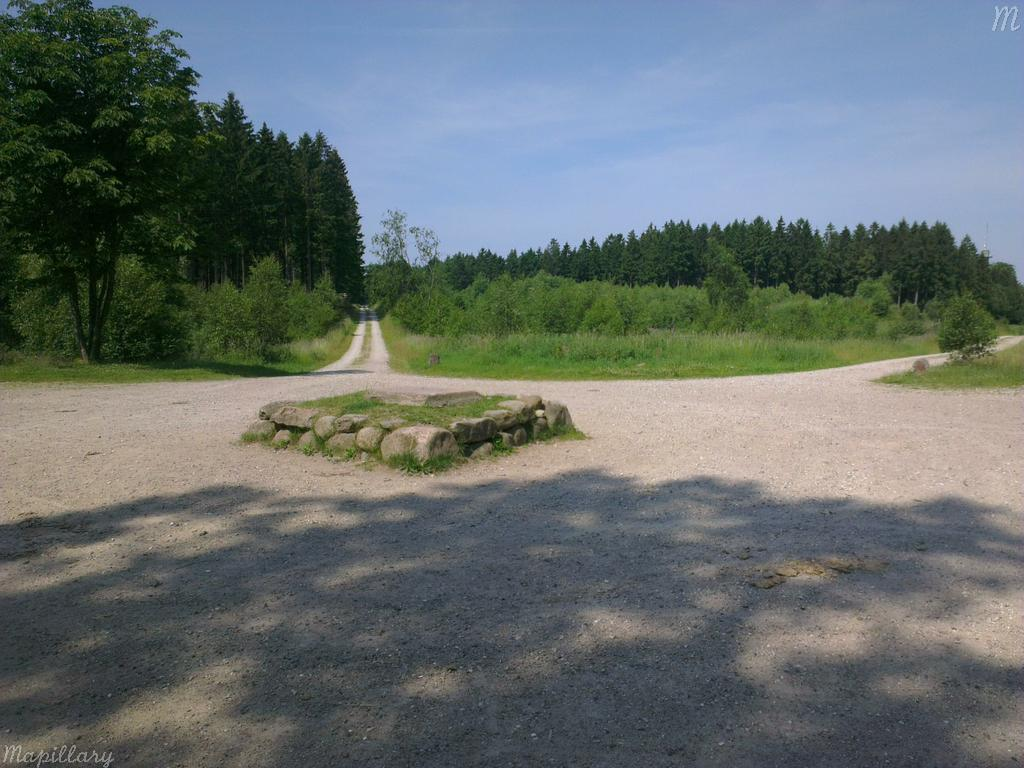
Store Dyrehave (UNESCO-listed)

== Mølleåen ==
One of the main attractions of the area is the Mølleå Valley along the river which runs 36 km (22 mi) from the west of Bastrup Sø near Lynge to the Øresund between Taarbæk and Skodsborg. There are several notable country houses overlooking the river and the lakes through which it passes as well as a series of historic water mills which contributed to Denmark's industrial development. As early as the Viking Age, the river was used for milling. From the Middle Ages, its water power was increased by means of dams between the lake of Furesø and the river mouth at the Øresund. In the 17th century, sizeable industrial enterprises were established along the river giving it the reputation of being the cradle of Danish industry. They included mills for the production of textiles, metals, paper and armaments. The factories operated until the 1950s after which they began to close, leaving buildings that were put to other uses such as the Brede Works, now an industrial museum, and the Strandmøllen paper mill.

== Transport ==
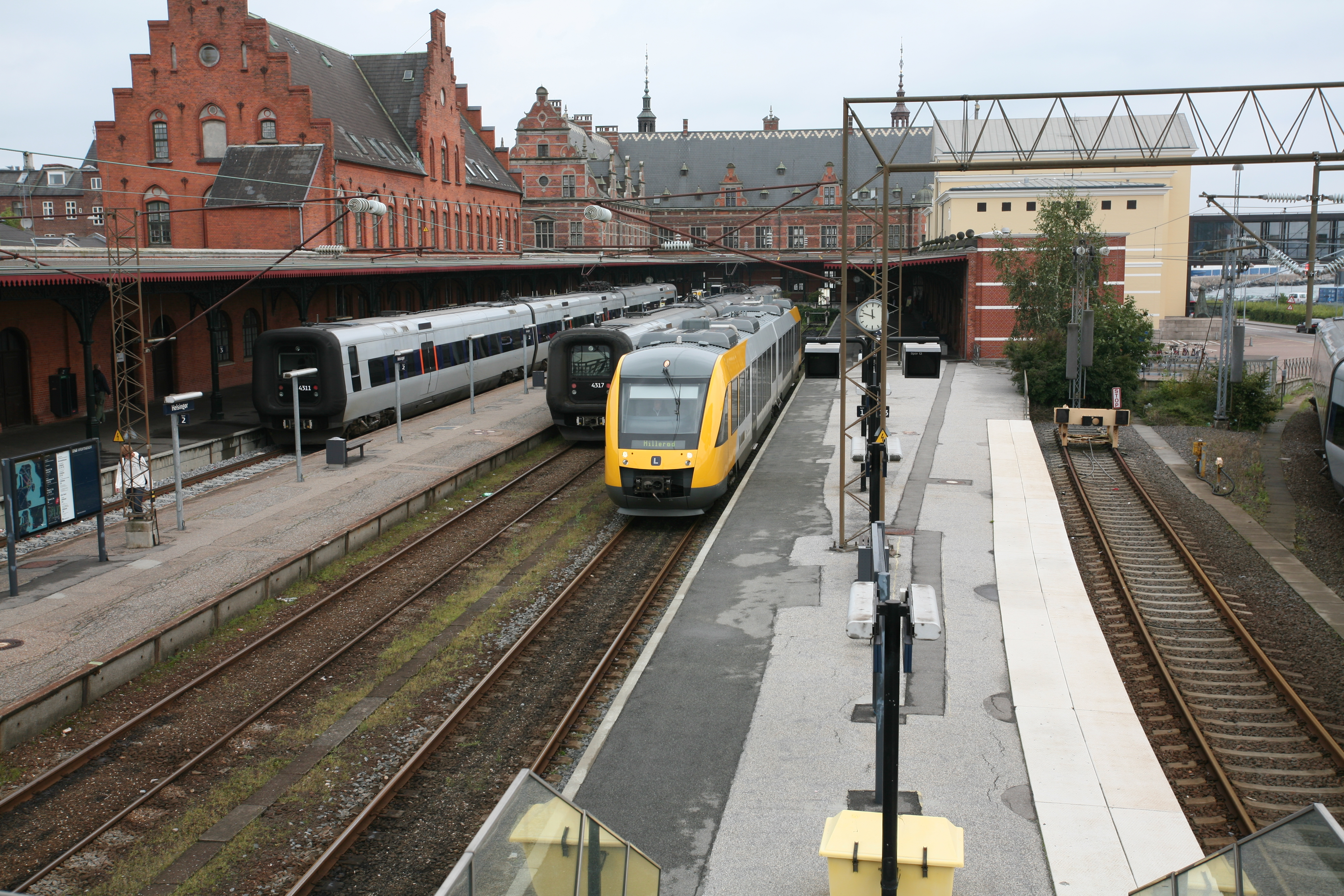
Helsingør Station

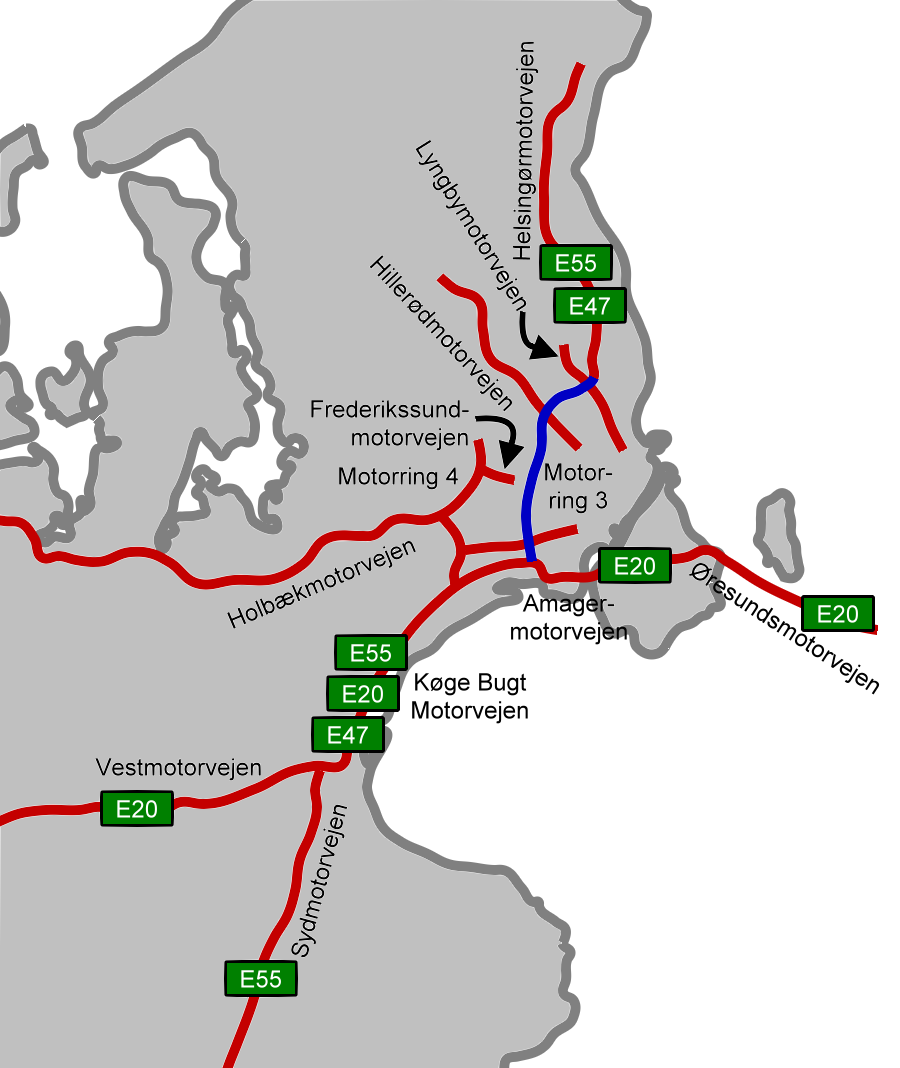
Motorways in North Zealand

The whole of North Zealand can be easily accessed from Copenhagen and its international airport. The main town, Helsingør, is only 47 km (29 mi) away and even Hundested to the northwest is not more than 66 km (41 mi) from the capital.

=== Railways ===
The region's major rail connections are the Coast Line (Kystbanen) between Copenhagen and Helsingør and three radials of the S-train network. Part of the Oresundtrain network, Coast Line trains with frequencies of up to once every ten minutes serve Klampenborg, Skodsborg, Vedbæk, Rungsted Kyst, Kokkedal, Nivå, Humlebæk, Espergærde, Snekkersten and Helsingør. The Hillerød radial serve Lyngby, Holte, Birkerød, Allerød and Hillerød. The Farum radial between Copenhagen and Farum and Frederikssund radial between Copenhagen and Frederikssund serve the southwestern portion of North Zealand, includings Værløse and Ølstykke–Stenløse.

The railway company Lokaltog operates local train services on the Hornbæk Line between Helsingør and Gilleleje, the Little North Line between Helsingør and Hillerød via Fredensborg, and the Gribskov Line which runs from Hillerød to both Tisvildeleje and Gilleleje. Lokaltog also operates services between Hillerød and Hundested in the northwest. There are also frequent S-trains on the North Line between Copenhagen and Hillerød with stops at Jægersborg, Lyngby, Sorgenfri, Virum, Holte, Birkerød, Høvelte and Allerød.

=== Motorways ===
The Helsingør Motorway, part of European route E47, connects Copenhagen to Helsingør with exits at Espergærde, Humlebæk, Nivå, Kokkedal, Hørsholm, Vedbæk, Gl. Holte, Nærum, Lundtofte and Lyngby. The Hillerød Motorway (Hillerødmotorvejen) covers the first 19 km (12 mi) of Route 16 between Copenhagen and Hillerød via Farum, continuing as an expressway.

=== Ferries ===
Frequent ferry services operate between Helsingør and Helsingborg in Sweden. The terminal in Helsingør is within walking distance of the railway station. The crossing takes about 20 minutes. A small vehicle ferry operates regularly between Hundested and Rørvig in Odsherred across the channel leading into the Isefjord Roskilde Fjord. In summer, another ferry operates between Sølager (now part of Hundested) and Kulhuse on the tip of the Hornsherred peninsula.

=== Cycling ===
As elsewhere in Denmark, cycling is popular in North Zealand with several signposted cycle routes. A number of cycle routes and downloadable maps are available from Hillerød Municipality. The North Coast Track (Nordkyststien) from Helsingør to Hundested is also a popular route.

== North Zealand in art ==
Thanks to the encouragement of C.W. Eckersberg who taught at the Royal Danish Academy of Fine Arts, from the mid-19th century a considerable number of painters went to Hornbæk where they painted real life in the open air. From 1872, the village became popular with Viggo Johansen, Kristian Zahrtmann, P.S. Kroyer and Carl Locher who painted the harbour and the local fishermen. The painters returned to Hornbæk every summer apart from Locher who lived there from 1880 to 1889.

Kronborg and Frederksborg have also been a favourite subject for artists since the 18th century.

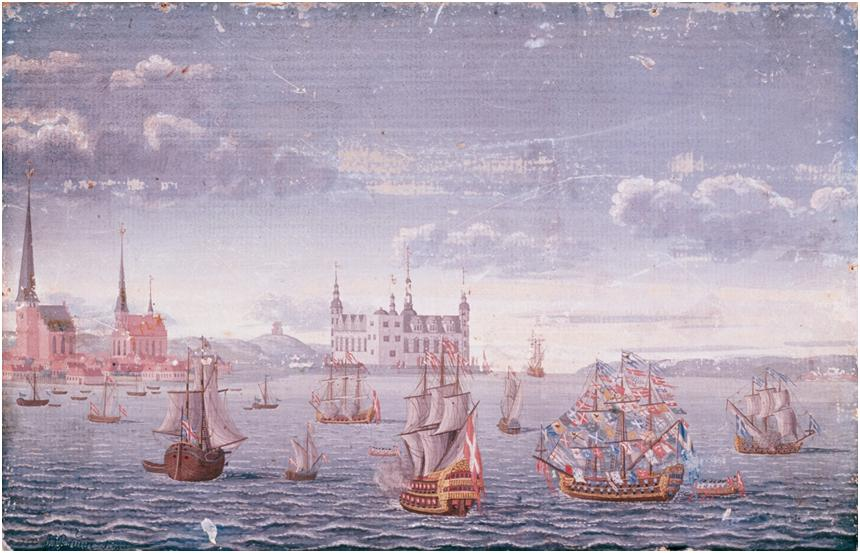
Johan Jacob Bruun: Kronborg (1739)

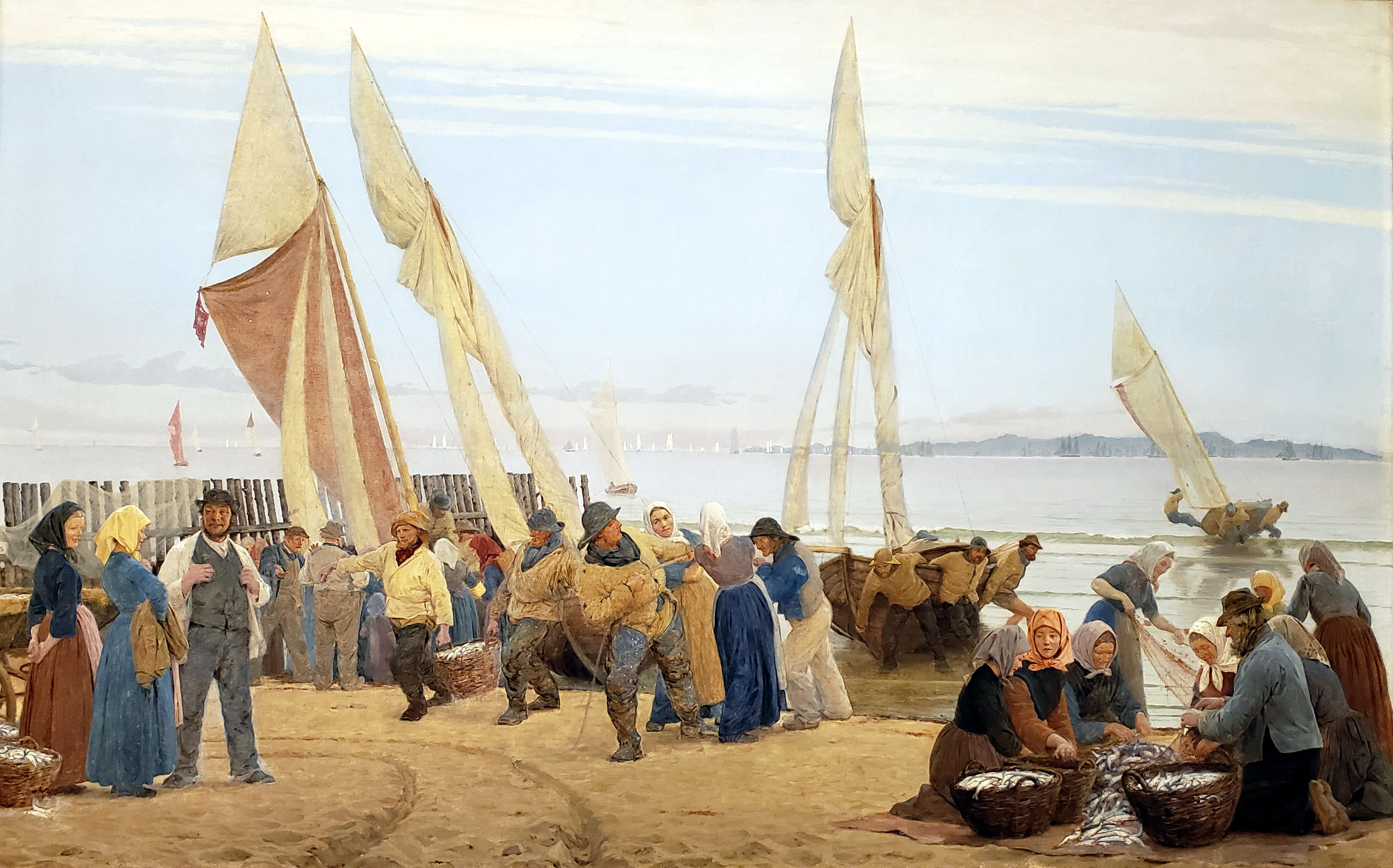
P.S. Krøyer: Morning at Hornbæk. The fishermen returning (1875)

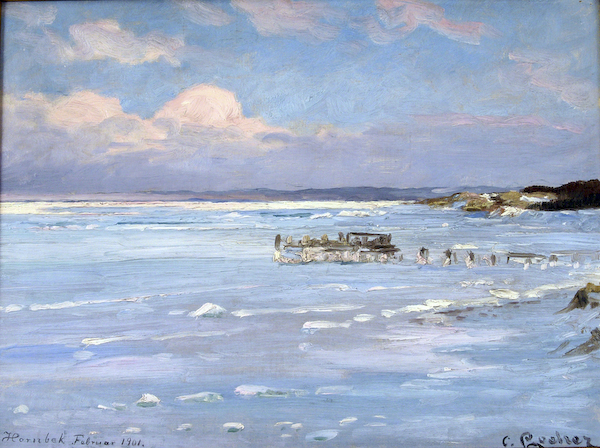
Carl Locher: Sundet lukkes. Hornbæk Strand (1901)

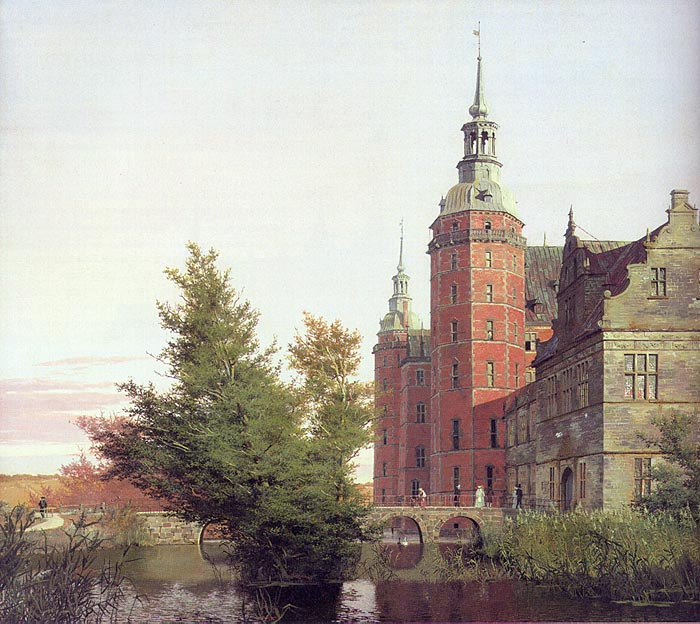
Christian Købke: Frederiksborg (1836)

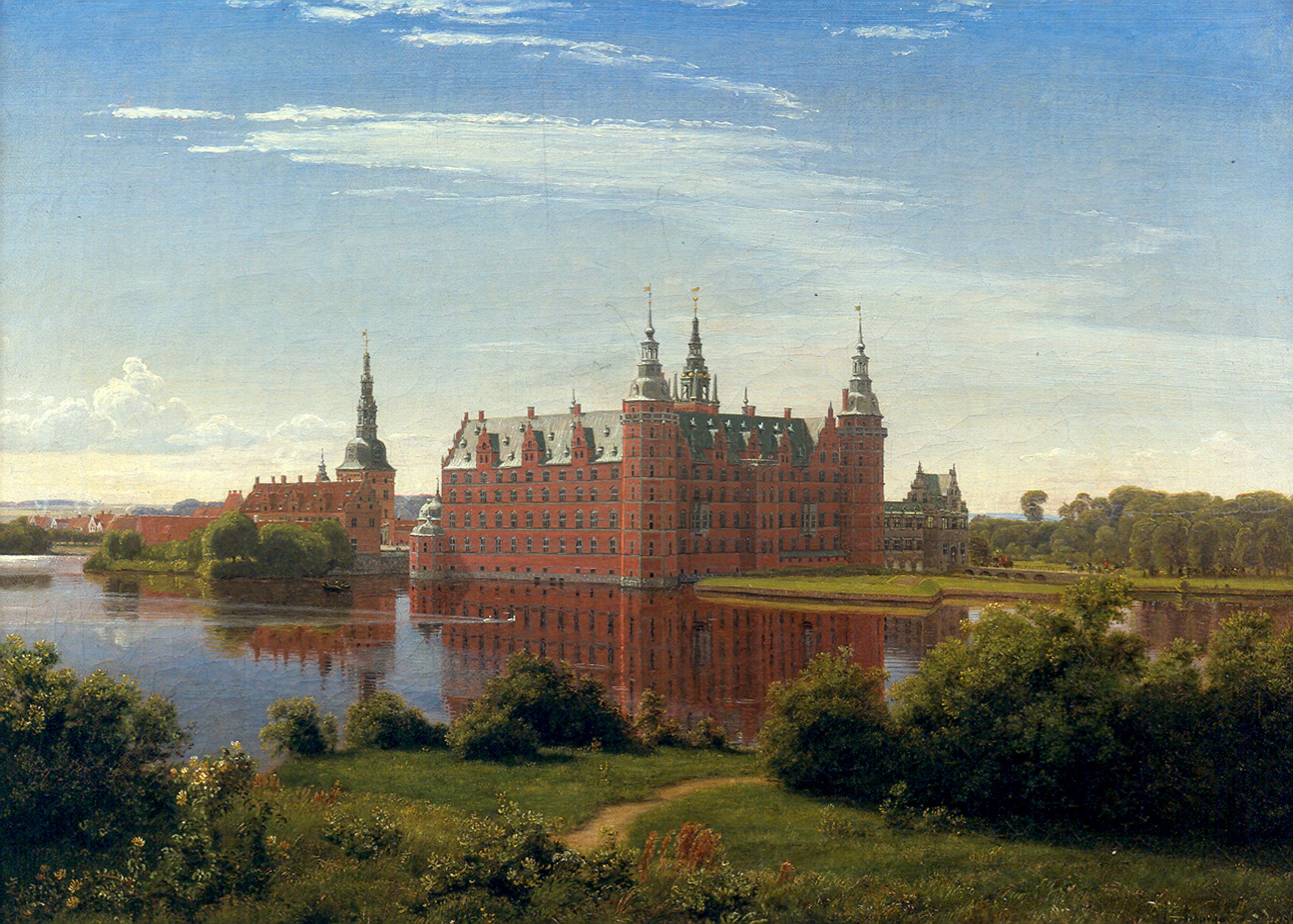
P.C. Skovgaard: Frederiksborg (1841)

== Developing tourism ==
Under the catchword Kongernes Nordsjælland (Royal North Zealand), the Danish tourist authorities have been trying to attract more tourists to the region. Tourist group Visit North Sealand reports a 6.4% increase in overnight stays in 2013 as compared to 2012. It followed a substantial increase in 2012 when North Zealand recorded the second highest increase in tourism after Copenhagen. This was partly a result of 21 million Danish kroner in funding from the European Union designed to provide more focused attention to the area's potential for tourism. One of the objectives has been to extend cooperation between the region's cities and municipalities which had previously competed with one another. One of the concrete initiatives is to improve opportunities for cycling in the region.

Progress is also being made towards the opening of a national park in the area, provisionally known as Nationalpark Kongernes Nordsjælland (Royal North Zealand National Park).

== See also ==
- Par force hunting landscape in North Zealand, a UNESCO-listed World Heritage Site
- Kongernes Nordsjælland, the planned national par
- FC Nordsjælland
- Nordsjælland Håndbold

== Literature ==
- Hartmann, Godfred (1986). Nordsjælland. Gyldendal. ISBN 978-87-00-81084-6.
- Porter, Darwin; Prince, Danforth (2009). Frommer's Denmark. John Wiley & Sons. pp. 170–. ISBN 978-0-470-50290-7.
