= Vedbæk railway station =

Railway station in North Zealand, Denmark

Vedbæk
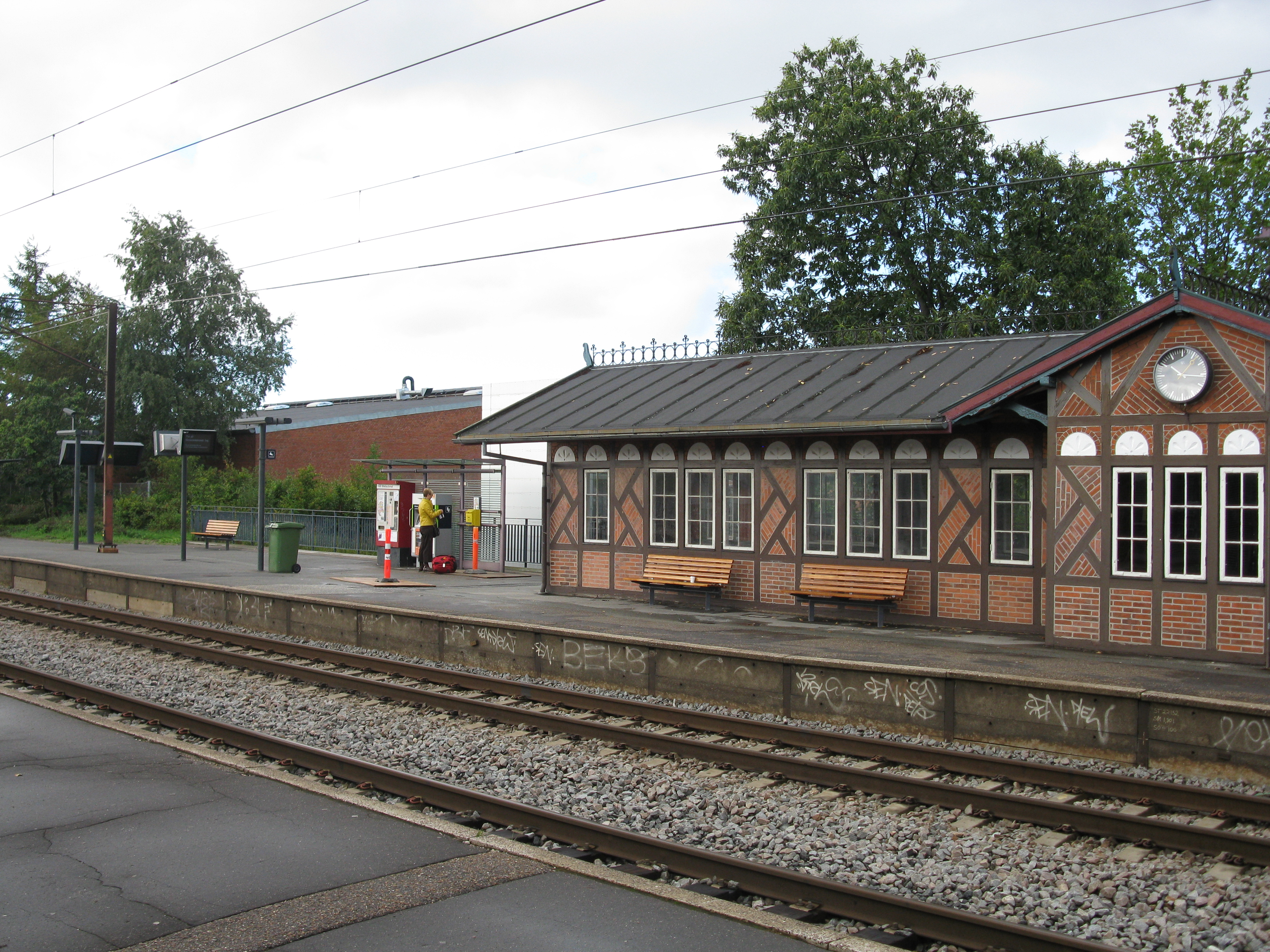
- Vedbæk station in 2010

General information
- Location: Vedbæk Stationsvej 20; 2950 Vedbæk; Rudersdal Municipality; Denmark
- Coordinates: 55°51′10″N 12°33′45″E
- Elevation: 5.1 metres (17 ft)
- Owner: DSB (station infrastructure); Banedanmark (rail infrastructure)
- Line: Coast Line
- Train operators: DSB
- Connections: Bus line 193 and 195

Construction
- Architect: Heinrich Wenck

History
- Opened: 2 August 1897

Services
| Preceding station | DSB | Following station |
|---|---|---|
| Rungsted Kyst towards Helsingør | Elsinore–Copenhagen– Roskilde–Holbæk Regional train | Skodsborg towards Holbæk |
| Rungsted Kyst towards Helsingør | Elsinore–Copenhagen– Roskilde–Næstved Regional train | Skodsborg towards Næstved |
Location

Vedbæk Station is a railway station serving the suburb of Vedbæk on the coast of North Zealand, c. 20 km north of central Copenhagen, Denmark.

The station is located on the Coast Line between Helsingør and Copenhagen. The train services are currently operated by Danish State Railways (DSB) which runs a frequent regional rail service to Copenhagen Central Station.

== History ==
The station opened in connection with the inauguration of the Coast Line on 2 August 1897. At the time of its opening in 1900, the Nærum Line reached all the way to Vedbæk Station but the stretch from Nærum to Vedbæk was closed in 1923 due to economic constraints.

The main station building on Vedbæk Stationsvej has now been closed and is rented out for private celebrations and other events.

== Architecture ==
Like the other stations on the Coast Line, Vedbæk Station was designed by Heinrich Wenck in a National Romantic style.

Two former residences for personnel from 1908 with various outbuildings are listed. They are designed by Christian Brandstrup and Holger Rasmussen.

== See also ==
- List of railway stations in Denmark
