= Skodsborg railway station =

Railway station in North Zealand, Denmark

Skodsborg
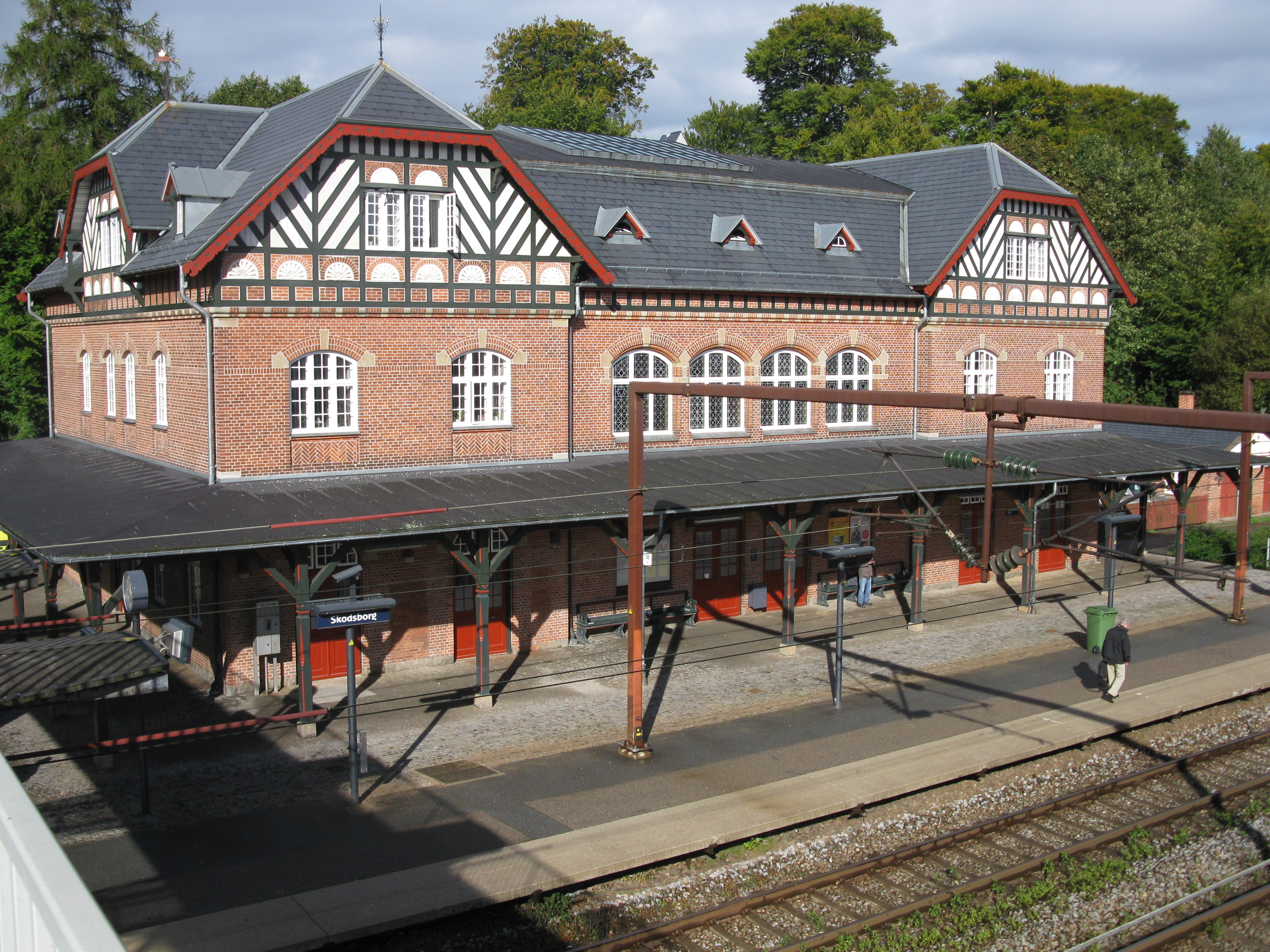
- The main station building

General information
- Location: Bøllemosevej 4; 2942 Skodsborg; Rudersdal Municipality; Denmark
- Coordinates: 55°49′25″N 12°34′18″E
- Elevation: 15.8 metres (52 ft)
- Owner: DSB (station infrastructure); Banedanmark (rail infrastructure)
- Line: Coast Line
- Train operators: DSB
- Connections: Bus line 194

History
- Opened: 2 August 1897

Services
Preceding station	DSB	Following station
Vedbæk towards Helsingør	Elsinore–Copenhagen– Roskilde–Holbæk Regional train	Klampenborg towards Holbæk
Vedbæk towards Helsingør	Elsinore–Copenhagen– Roskilde–Næstved Regional train	Klampenborg towards Næstved
Location

Skodsborg Station is a regional railway station serving the suburb and seaside resort of Skodsborg, about 20 km north of central Copenhagen, Denmark.

The station is located on the Coast Line between Helsingør and Copenhagen. The train services are currently operated by Danish State Railways (DSB) which runs a frequent regional rail service to Copenhagen Central Station. Skodsborg is a quiet residential neighbourhood and the station sees mostly local traffic.

== History ==
The station opened in connection with the inauguration of the Coast Line on 2 August 1897.

== Architecture ==
Typical of the stations on the Coast Line, Skodsborg Station is designed by Heinrich Wenck in the National Romantic style. The main station building is located on the east side of the tracks while a pavilion with waiting room is located on their west side.

The station is listed.

== Cultural references ==
The station is used as a location in the films Det gamle guld (1951) and Min søsters børn (1966).

== See also ==
- List of railway stations in Denmark
- Rail transport in Denmark
- History of rail transport in Denmark
- Transport in Copenhagen
- Transport in Denmark
