= Lise Roel and Hugo Höstrup =

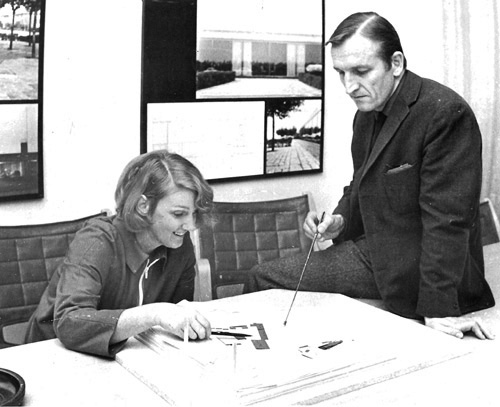
Lise Roel and Hugo Höstrup in 1969

Lise Roel (July 3, 1928 – May 12, 2017) and Hugo Höstrup, (May 30, 1928 – October 30, 2004) were architects born in Randers, Denmark, with primary activity and production around 1960–1980 in western and southern Sweden.

== Career ==
The couple graduated as architects in 1954 from the Royal Academy of Fine Arts in Copenhagen. Following internships in Rome and a period as partners in an architectural firm in Halmstad from 1957 onwards, they established their own office in 1967 which remained in activity until 1981, when the couple moved to the south of France.

Their production was mainly focused on public buildings (schools, police headquarters, service apartment buildings, urban renewal and restorations) and during 1960-1980 they won around 20 architectural competitions. Projects by Höstrup have been exhibited at Charlottenborg and Louisiana in Denmark and at the Swedish Museum of Architecture. The buildings, including in latter years the couple's two private houses in the south of France, have been published in various reviews. The Höstrups were in regular dialogue with and were close personal friends of the famous furniture designer Poul Kjærholm (1929–80) and his wife architectural professor Hanne Kjærholm (1930–2009).

Among the buildings that Lise and Hugo Höstrup designed and built in Halmstad are: police headquarters (1960), main post office (1960), Malcus office building (1961), Hallandia hotel (1968), Sannarp school (1969), Vallås church (1974) and Kattegatt vocational school (1981). They further designed the town hall and library in Båstad (1979) and the police headquarters in Norrköping (1965), Borås (1965) and Kalmar (1979).
