= Louisiana Literature festival =

Annual Literary Festival in Louisiana

Louisiana Literature
- Status: Active
- Genre: Literary festival
- Begins: Late August
- Ends: Late August
- Frequency: Annually
- Locations: Humlebæk, Denmark
- Country: Denmark
- Inaugurated: 2010
- Most recent: 2024
- Next event: 2025
- Attendance: 18.000 people
- Organiser: Christian Lund (founder)
- Sponsor: Davids Fond og Samling
- Website: https://www.louisiana.dk/en/whats-on/louisiana-literature

Louisiana Literature Festival is an annual literary festival which takes place around the third weekend of August at the Louisiana Museum of Modern Art, 35 km (22 mi) north of Copenhagen, Denmark. The festival began in 2010, and each year it features around forty writers from all over the world over a span of four days.

Situated throughout the museum and the sculpture garden, the festival encompasses conversations between writers as well as between writers and critics, readings and various performances.

== Background ==
Since its opening in 1958, literature has played a special and vital role at the Louisiana Museum of Modern Art. Through the years the museum has welcomed writers and literary events on the same scale as other art forms such as music and architecture. Nordic poetry days have been held at Louisiana, which in the 1980s became a meeting forum for dissident writers from Eastern Europe. In 1992 Louisiana also saw the first public appearance by Salman Rushdie following his fatwa and subsequent years of living in hiding.

In November 1988 Susan Sontag visited Louisiana and stated to a newspaper: "I loved Louisiana. The atmosphere is so special, democratic in a good way, friendly and radiant with a love of art and nature. A kind of model for what a good society could be – both very open and welcoming and in addition of very high standards. As a rule, a high level shuts people out, and openness has a tendency to lower the standard. But you have something that does not make compromises but is at the same time for all. The world should be full of Louisianas – and I don't just mean museums!"

== Festival experience ==
In connection with their participation in the festival, writers have stated:

- Ali Smith: “I think that the bringing together of writers and public in a space, which is about art, is the whole gift of this place (…), as soon as you put the arts, different arts, together something transformative happens, you know all the borders get crossed”.
- Patti Smith: “There has been such warmth from the people. Such big gatherings. So much enthusiasm. (…) It’s been stimulating. Everything that I am interested in, I found someone that can teach me something”.
- Günter Grass: “I have been a true fan of this place for many years, and this has been a genuinely fine experience. I also met very nice and interested colleagues”.
- Jonathan Safran Foer: “I would mention to people, friends of mine, artists, writers, that I was coming and many of them said that this was their favorite museum in the world, and it’s easy to understand why. It’s a very unique place”.
- Taiye Selasi: “The scenery is exquisite and it’s small. And I think the two things put together mean you have this really intimate experience here”.

=== Audio walks ===
Throughout the years, authors have been invited to write about works from the Louisiana Museum's collection and spaces at the museum. In connection with the festival, the texts are presented as literary sound experiments in audio walks. Contributing writers include Anne Carson, Sjón, Teju Cole, Kenneth Goldsmith, Kiran Desai and Tomomi Adachi.

== Louisiana Channel ==
Videos from the festival are made available through Louisiana Channel, the English-language web-TV channel.

=== Selected conversations on stage ===
- Siri Hustvedt and Paul Auster.
- Karl Ove Knausgård and Tomas Espedal.
- Richard Ford and Colm Tóibín.
- Taiye Selasi and Colum McCann.
- Adonis and Ibrahim al-Koni.
- Leonardo Padura and Yan Lianke.
- Jonathan Safran Foer and Jeffrey Eugenides.

=== Selected writers on stage ===
- Chimamanda Ngozi Adichie.
- Alaa al-Aswany.
- Margaret Atwood.
- Lydia Davis.
- Karl Ove Knausgård.
- Chris Kraus.
- Ian McEwan.
- Herta Müller.
- Joyce Carol Oates.
- Patti Smith.
- Zadie Smith.
- Michel Houellebecq.

=== Selected performances ===
- Tomomi Adachi.
- Laurie Anderson.
- Anne Carson.

=== Backstage interviews ===
- Adonis.
- César Aira.
- Svetlana Alexievich.
- Hiromi Itō.
- Claudio Magris.
- Javier Marías.
- Péter Nádas.
- Eileen Myles.
- Sally Rooney.
- Samanta Schweblin meets Valeria Luiselli.
- Ngugi wa Thiong’o.
- Olga Tokarczuk.

=== Writers exploring art at the Louisiana ===
- Siri Hustvedt on the experience of art.
- Colm Tóibín on Giacometti.
- Daniel Kehlmann, James McBride and Sjón on Olafur Eliasson’s installation Riverbed.

== Louisiana Literature 2025-2010 (International writers) ==
=== 2025 ===
Featuring Chimamanda Ngozi Adichie (NG), Laurie Anderson (US), Karl Kofi Ahlqvist (SE), Kamel Daoud (FR), Richard Flanagan (AU), Charlotte Gneuss (DE), Samantha Harvey (UK), Johan Harstad (NO), Seán Hewitt (IE/UK), Zülfü Livaneli, (TR), Édouard Louis (FR), Maggie Nelson (US), Aaiún Nin (AO), Sally Rooney (IE), Elif Shafak (TR), Neige Sinno (FR), Hwang Sok-yong (KR)

=== 2024 ===
Featuring Anne Boyer (US), Anne Carson (CA), Mircea Cartarescu (RO), Rachel Cusk (UK), Joanna Rubin Dranger (SE), Matias Faldbakken (NO), Lauren Groff (US), Mohsin Hamid (PK), Oliver Lovrenski (NO), Kim de L'Horizon (CH), Lorrie Moore (US), Max Porter (UK), Adania Shibli (PS), Danez Smith (US), Colm Tóibín IE), Peter Waterhouse (AU), Kjell Westö (FI)

=== 2023 ===
Featuring Constance Debré (FR), Hernan Diaz (AR), Claudia Durastanti (IT/US), Ia Genberg (SE), Abdulrazak Gurnah (TZ/UK), Tessa Hadley (UK), Frida Isberg (IS), Claire Keegan (IR), Ian McEwan (UK), Eva Menasse (AT), Haruki Murakami (JP), Joyce Carol Oates (US), Audur Ava Olafsdottir (IS), Karolina Ramqvist (SE), Ali Smith (UK), Wole Soyinka (NG), Camila Sosa Villada (AR)

=== 2022 ===
Featuring Laurie Anderson (US), Claire-Louise Bennett (UK), Natasha Brown (UK), Bernardine Evaristo (UK), Judith Hermann (DE), Benjamín Labatut (CL), Ben Lerner (US), Deborah Levy (UK), Édouard Louis (FR), Pola Oloixarac (AR), Torrey Peters (US), Koleka Putuma (ZA), Marieke Lucas Rijneveld (NL), Alex Schulman (SE), Jón Kalman Stefánsson (IS), Maria Stepanova (RU), Carl Frode Tiller (NO), Linn Ullmann (NO), Ocean Vuong (VN/US)

=== 2019 ===
Featuring Robert Crumb, (US), Aline Kominsky-Crumb (US), Rachel Cusk (UK), Tomas Espedal (NO), Matias Faldbakken (NO), Katarzyna Fetlińska (PL), Roxane Gay (US), Lisa Halliday (US), Isabella Hammad (UK), Michel Houellebecq (FR), László Krasznahorkai (HU), Mazen Maarouf (LB), Sayaka Murata (JP), Ben Okri (NI/UK), Shahrnush Parsipur (IR), Per Petterson (NO), Claudia Rankine (US), Elif Shafak (TR/UK), Sjón (IS), Sara Stridsberg (SE), Anne Waldman (US)

=== 2018 ===
Featuring Johannes Anyuru (SE), Anne Carson (CA), Teju Cole (US/NI), CAConrad (US), Niels Fredrik Dahl (NO), Mariana Enriquez (AR), Georgi Gospodinov (BG), Hiromi Itō (JP), Tahar Ben Jelloun (MA), Daniel Kehlmann (AU/DE), Jan Kjærstad (NO), Christian Kracht (CH), Javier Marías (ES), Péter Nádas (HU), Guadalupe Nettel (MX), Sally Rooney (IR), Domenico Starnone (IT), Yoko Tawada (JP), Delphine de Vigan (FR), Gunnhild Øyehaug (NO)

=== 2017 ===
Featuring Svetlana Alexievich (BY), Laurie Anderson (US), Paul Auster (US), Álvaro Enrigue (MX), Vigdis Hjorth]] (NO), Yu Hua (CH), Siri Hustvedt (US), Linda Boström Knausgård (SE), Chris Kraus (US), Édouard Louis (FR), Valeria Luiselli (MX), Imbolo Mbue (CM), Nástio Mosquito, (AO) Eileen Myles (US), Jenny Offill (US), Cia Rinne (SE), Samanta Schweblin(AR), Zadie Smith (GB), Colson Whitehead (US)

=== 2016 ===
Featuring Julian Barnes (UK), Caroline Bergvall (NO/FR), Tomas Espedal (NO), Beate Grimsrud (NO), Erica Jong (DK), Jonas Hassen Khemiri (SE), Karl Ove Knausgård (NO), Claudio Magris (IT), Jóanes Nielsen (FA), Chigozie Obioma (NG), Steve Roggenbuck (US), Rike Scheffler (DE), Abdellah Taïa (MA), Olga Tokarczuk (PL), Linn Ullmann (NO), Carl-Henning Wijkmark (SE), Hanya Yanagihara (US), Nell Zink (US)

=== 2015 ===
Featuring Marie Darrieussecq (FR), Hans Magnus Enzensberger (DE), Richard Ford (US), Jonas Gardell (SE), Kenneth Goldsmith (US), Niviaq Korneliussen (DK/GR), Rachel Kushner (US), Yan Lianke (CH), Leonardo Padura (CU), Lyudmila Petrushevskaya (RU), Clemens Setz (AT), Vladimir Sorokin (RU), Sara Stridsberg (SE), Colm Tóibín (IR), Ngugi wa Thiong'o (KE)

=== 2014 ===
Featuring Alaa al-Aswany (EG), Lena Andersson (SE), Margaret Atwood (CA), Teju Cole (NG/US), Lydia Davis (US), Péter Esterházy (HU), Athena Farrokhzad (SE), Roy Jacobsen (NO), Daniel Kehlmann (AT/DE), James McBride (US), Philipp Meyer (US),David Mitchell (UK), Herta Müller (RO/DE), Joyce Carol Oates (US), Michael Ondaatje (CA), Sjón (IS), Herbjørg Wassmo (NO)

=== 2013 ===
Featuring Tomomi Adachi (JP), [Johannes Anyuru (SE), Katarina Frostenson (SE), Olga Grjasnowa (DE), Einar Már Guðmundsson (IS), Jenny Hval (NO), Nick Laird (IE), Waciny Laredj (DZ), Rosa Liksom (FI), Erlend Loe (NO), Colum McCann (US), Ian McEwan (UK), Sofi Oksanen (FI), Antonio Pennacchi (IT), Per Petterson (NO), Taiye Selasi (UK), Fredrik Sjöberg (SE), Zadie Smith (UK)

=== 2012 ===
Featuring César Aira (ARG), Anne Carson (CAN), Kiran Desai (IND), Kerstin Ekman (SE), Tomas Espedal (NO), Jeffrey Eugenides (US), Alan Hollinghurst (GB), Nicole Krauss (US), Mara Lee (SE), Henning Mankell (SE), Hisham Matar (LY), Cia Rinne (SE), Jonathan Safran Foer (US), Judith Schalansky (D), Patti Smith (US),Göran Sonnevi (SE), Linn Ullmann (SE), David Vann (US)

=== 2011 ===
Featuring Adonis (SY), Ibrahim al-Koni (LY), Chimamanda Ngozi Adichie (NG), Kjell Askildsen (N), Alberto Blanco (MEX), Linda Boström Knausgård (SE), Junot Díaz (DO/US), Gyrdir Eliasson (IS),David Grossman (IL), Karl Ove Knausgård (NO), Märta Tikkanen (FI), Yiyun Li (CN/US), DBC Pierre (AU), Marilynne Robinson (US); Lars Saabye Christensen (NO), Steve Sem-Sandberg (SE), Gary Shteyngart (US); Ilija Trojanow (BG/DE), Juli Zeh (DE)

=== 2010 ===
Featuring Kerstin Ekman (S), Tomas Espedal (NO), Tua Forsström (FI), Günter Grass (DE), Hallgrímur Helgason (IS), Karl Ove Knausgård (N), Franck Leibovici (F), John Ajvide Lindqvist (SE),Sofi Oksanen (FI), Ali Smith (UK), Dag Solstad (NO), Jón Kalman Stefánsson (IS), Sara Stridsberg (SE), Jean-Philippe Toussaint (B), Kevin Vennemann (D)
