= Henry Heerup =

Danish artist (1907–1993)

Henry Heerup (4 November 1907 – 30 May 1993) was a Danish painter, graphic artist and sculptor. Heerup was an extremely versatile artist. His works of art included paintings, lithographs, stone sculptures, linoleum cuts and drawings as well as objects which he composed from scrap.

== Biography ==
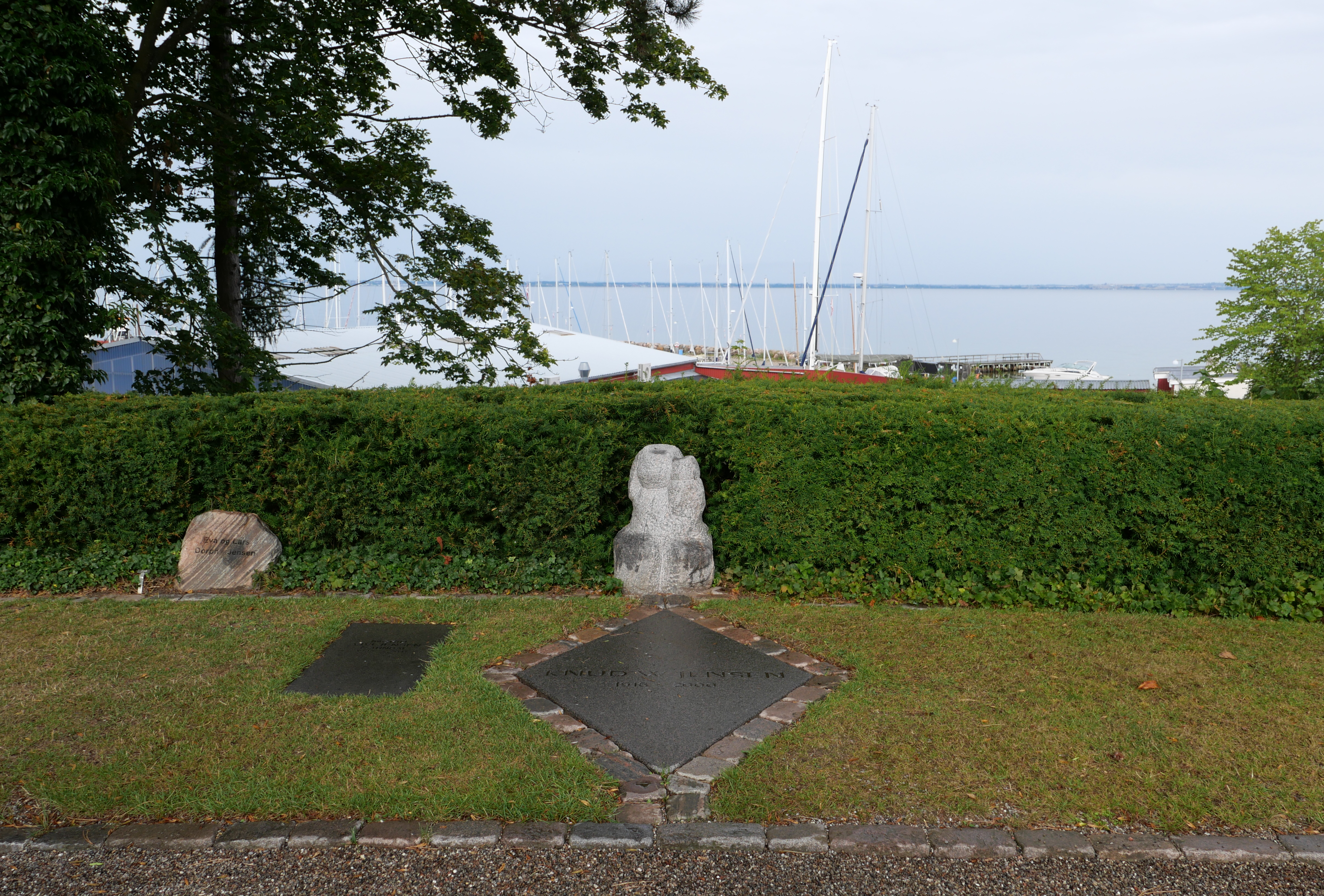
A sulcpture by Heerup at the grave of Knud W. Jensen, the founder of the Louisiana Museum of Modern Art, in Humlebæk, Denmark

Henry Heerup was born in Frederiksberg, Denmark. Heerup was admitted to the Royal Danish Academy of Fine Arts in 1926 and graduated in 1932. He studied painting under Axel Jørgensen and Einar Nielsen at the Royal Danish Academy of Art. He also studied sculpture under Einar Utzon-Frank. He painted The Old Oak in Wolfvalley (1924) which was his first oil painting.

During the 1930s he developed his trash sculptures. During the 1940s he became a member of Corner and Høst and exhibited with them. In 1949 he joined COBRA and participated in some of their exhibitions. He developed an international reputation exhibiting across Europe and North America. From 1946 until his death in 1993, he maintained a studio and gallery on Kamstrupvej in Rødovre. Large parts of his art were created in the open in his garden.

Heerup was appointed a Knight of the Order of the Dannebrog in 1968. He was also awarded the Eckersberg Medal and the Thorvaldsen Medal, and received the Storm, P. Grant, and NL Stevns Grants.Louisiana Museum of Modern Art arranged a major retrospective in celebration of Heerup's art at the time of his sixtieth birthday in 1967. The film Et år med Henry (Jørgen Roos Film. 1967) by writer and director Jens Jørgen Thorsen focused on Henry Heerup's garden and studio in Rødovre.

On his death in 1993, Henry Heerup was interred in the Assistens Cemetery in the Nørrebro section of Copenhagen.

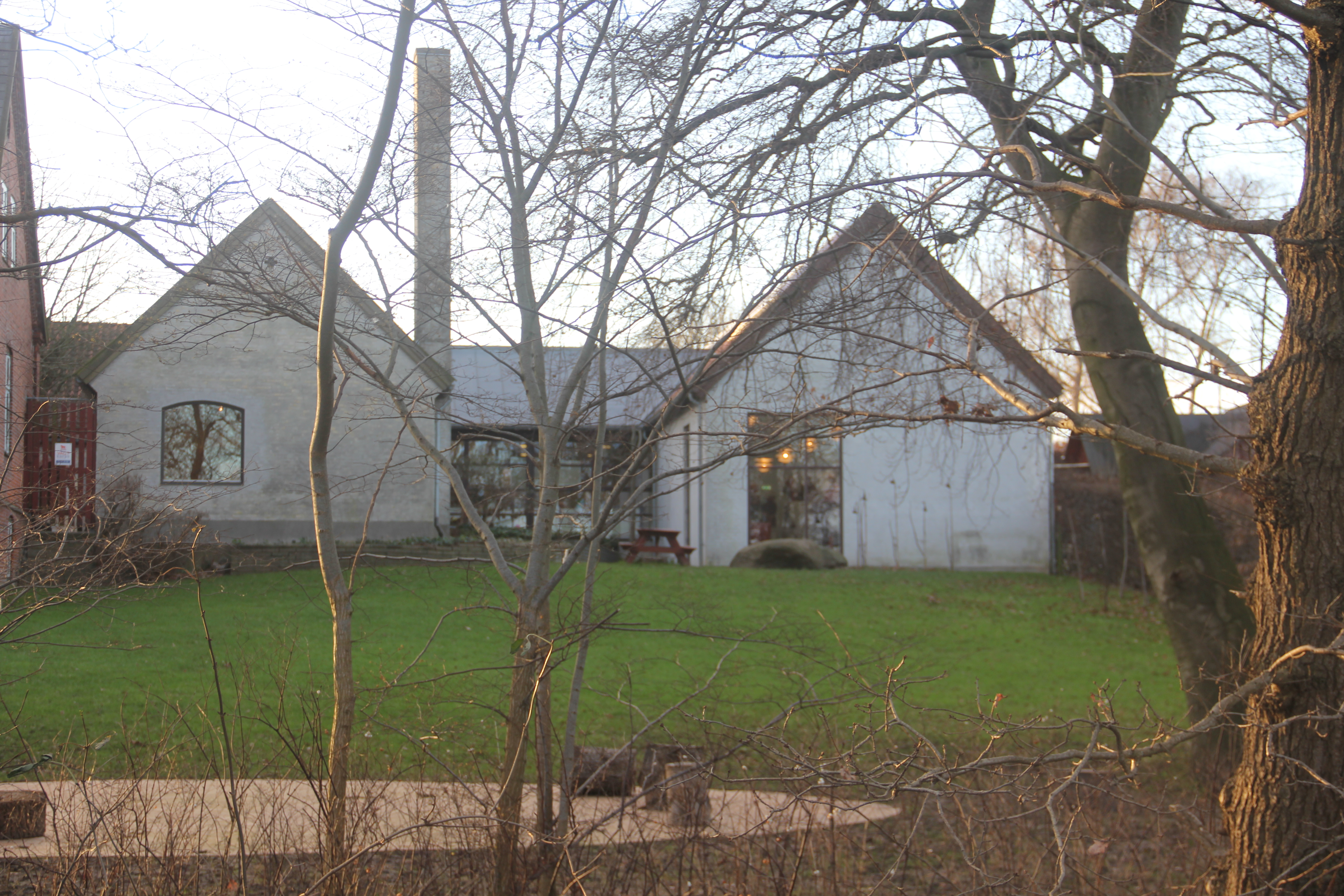
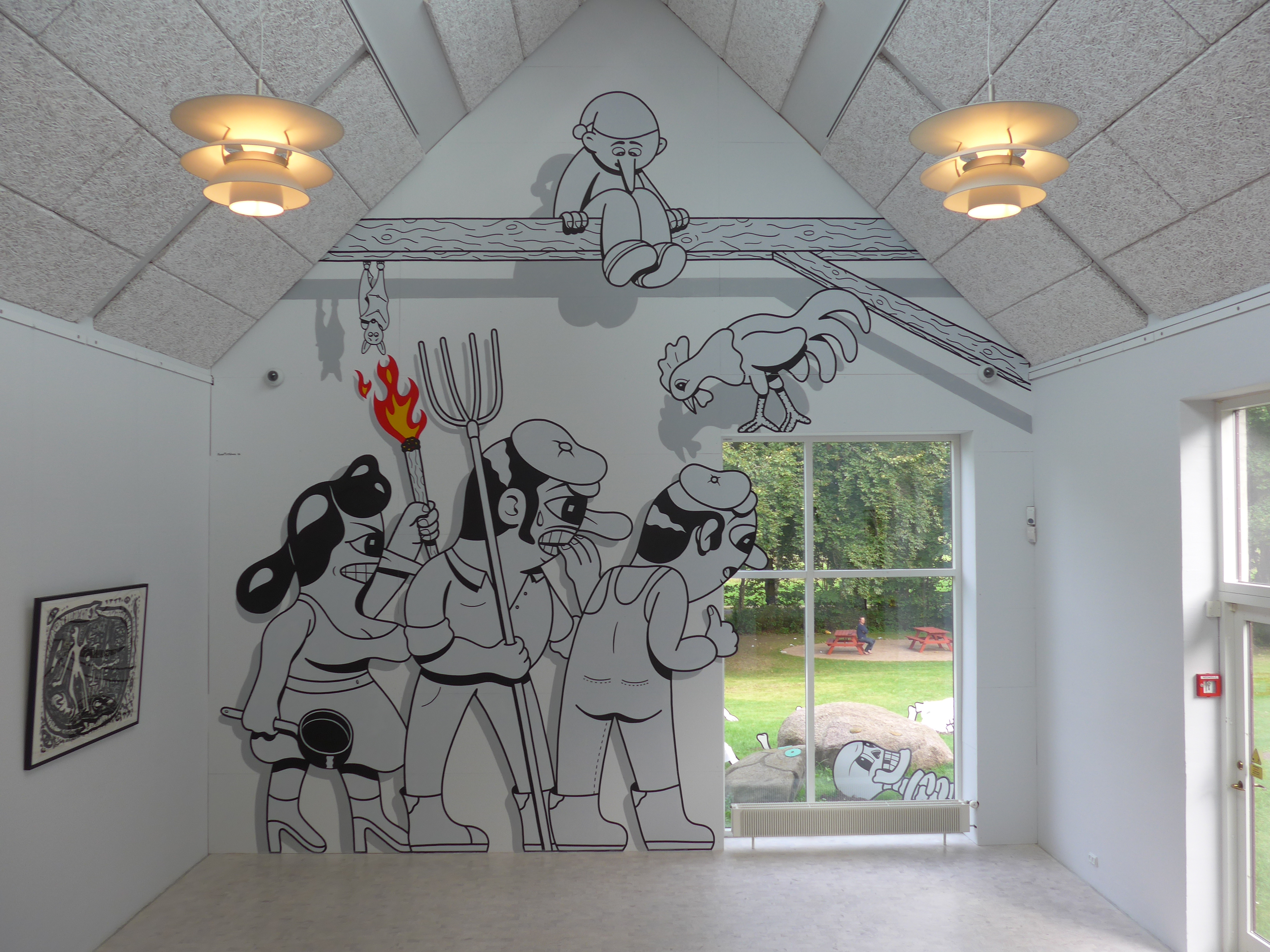
The museum

== Heerup Museum ==
In 1958, Heerup married conservator and painter Marion Brock. After Heerup's death, his widow donated their estate to Rødovre Municipality in 1995. Heerup Museum was designed by the architect Bernd Kjelland as an extension to the old farm Rødovregaard in Rødovre. The mainstay of the museum is a donation of Heerup's works. The museum opened on May 1, 2000.

== See also ==
- List of Danish painters

== Other sources ==
- Allan Daugaard Hansen (1996) Heerup : 1907-1993 : en billedkunstners livshistorie fortalt af en ven (Copenhagen: Borgen) ISBN 9788721005573
