= Hanne Kjærholm =

Danish architect

Hanne Kjærholm (24 May 1930 in Hjørring – 22 June 2009) was a Danish architect who also taught at the Danish Academy, where she became a professor in 1989.

Kjærholm did much to overcome the barriers to women's architecture. She was one of the few women to have her own architecture studio. Her works, though few, are noteworthy, designed in a modern style which draws on tradition. During her career, her buildings became ever more textural.

In 1988, she became the first woman to be awarded the Margot and Thorvald Dreyer Foundation's Architecture Prize. The following year she was the first woman to be appointed professor at the Academy's School of Architecture. She also served on many influential boards and committees.

== Early life ==
Hanne Kjærhom grew up in a liberal home in Hjørring in the north of Jutland. After passing the school certificate at Hjørring Gymnasium in 1949, she spent a year at the Design School for Women (Tegne- og Kunstindustriskolen for Kvinder) hoping to become a fashion designer in Paris. After tiring of the prospect, she turned to architecture entering the Academy the following year and graduating in 1956. In 1953, while still at the Academy, she married Poul Kjærholm who became a successful furniture designer.

== Career ==
Apart from a project from 1957 to 1959 when she worked together with her husband on designing picnic areas with concrete tables and toilets for the country roads around Hjørring, Hanne worked essentially on her own. The couple did however sometimes cooperate as when they built their own home in Rungsted in 1962. Hanne designed the building while Povl took care of the interiors. The simple, quiet house has since become recognized as a classic.

Her design for a marina in Nivå (1968) brought her the Academy's small gold medal although she was the only woman among 18 participants.

In Nerja in the south of Spain, taking full account of local building traditions, she rebuilt and restored her own house in 1970 and in 1976, undertook similar work on a house belonging to Knud W. Jensen, director of the Louisiana Museum of Modern Art.

In 1974, her interest in Japanese architecture was reflected in an extension to a house in Birkerød which was fitted with sliding doors and a large red sliding gateway.

In 1976, she won a commission to design an extension for the Holstebro Art Museum, adding a square-shaped structure pointing out in all directions. She wanted to show that a concrete building could be just as attractive as one built of brick or wood. The museum's functional requirements are beautifully addressed in a simple style, with plenty of daylight illuminating the exhibition spaces.

Simplicity is also reflected in a summer house on Læsø (1987) and in more recent projects including a second extension to the Holstebro Museum and the rebuilding of the Danish Museum of Art & Design from 1992 to 1995.

== Additional contributions ==
Side by side with her architecture practice, from 1958 Hanne Kjærholm was also employed as a research assistant at the Academy's School of Architecture until she was given an appointment as professor in 1989. She strove to promote the role of women in architecture, both at the Academy and at international conferences.

She also served on a number of committees, including as vice-chairman of the Charlottenborg prize-giving panels. At the Academy she chaired the architecture committee from 1991 and served on the Arts Foundation's Decoration Committee. She arranged a number of exhibitions, including a retrospective of her husband's work at the Louisiana Museum after his death in 1980. She was awarded the Eckersberg Medal in 1985 and the C. F. Hansen Medal in 1993, and in 1998 she was granted a lifelong stipendium from the National Arts Foundation.
