= Østervrå =

- Town
- Location in Denmark Østervrå (North Jutland Region)
- Coordinates: 57.34244°N 10.23743°E
- Country: Denmark
- Region: North Jutland Region
- Municipality: Frederikshavn

Area
  - Urban: 1.0 km^{2} (0.39 sq mi)

Population (1. January 2026)
  - Urban: 1,281
  - Urban density: 1,300/km^{2} (3,300/sq mi)
- Time zone: UTC+1 (Central European Time)
  - Summer (DST): UTC+2 (Central European Summer Time)
- Postal code: DK-9750 Østervrå

Østervrå (formerly Øster Vrå) is a town in Vendsyssel, North Jutland Region, Denmark. As of 2026, the town has a population of 1,281. The town and farm areas around the town were hit by an F3 tornado on September 9, 1924. Severe damage occurred with homes and farms partially collapsing. Additionally, a barn collapsed, and five people sustained injuries.

== Notable people ==
- Poul Kjærholm (1929 in Østervrå – 1980) a Danish industrial designer
- Ole Scherfig, (Danish Wiki) (1930 in Østervrå - 2000) business manager
- Joakim Mæhle (born 1997 in Østervrå) a Danish footballer at German Bundesliga club VfL Wolfsburg and the Danish National Team.

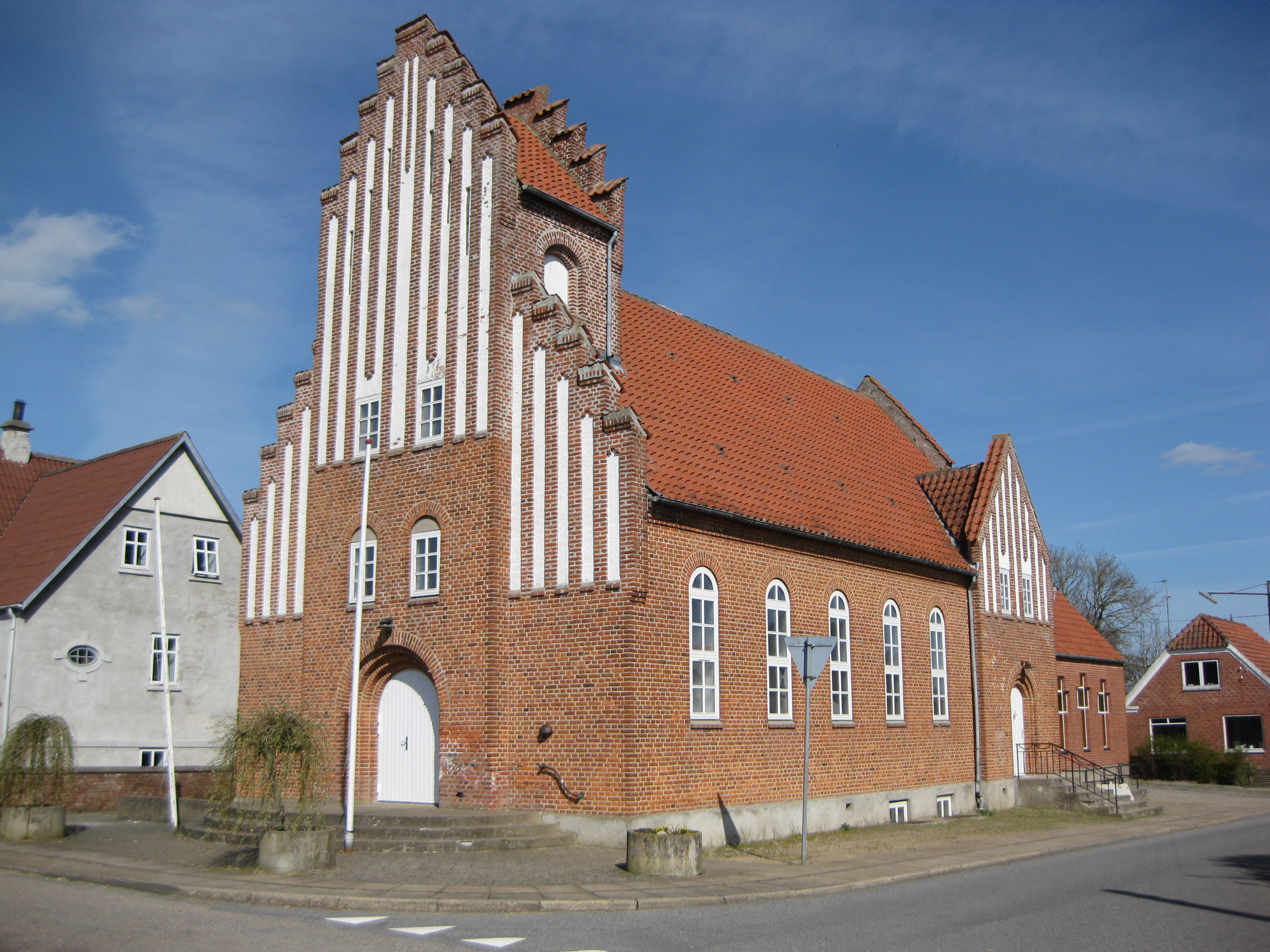
Baptist church
