= Poul Erik Tøjner =

Danish museum director and art critic

Poul Erik Tøjner (born 25 February 1959) is a Danish museum director and art critic. Since 2000 he has been director of the Louisiana Museum of Modern Art in Humlebæk, Denmark.

== Biography ==
Tøjner studied philosophy (1981) and Nordic philology (1987) at the University of Copenhagen, getting his master's degree in 1987 and a licentiate degree in 1991 with a dissertation on Søren Kierkegaard. He has been a literary and art critic first at national Danish newspaper Kristligt Dagblad from 1984 to 1987, Dagbladet Information from 1987 to 1989 and Weekendavisen from 1989 to 2000, where he served both as a cultural editor and from 1997 to 2000 was also as a member of the Editors-in-Chief. In 2000 he took up the post as director of the Louisiana Museum of modern Art and from 2007 a member of the Danish Academy. He is also the chairman of the board of the publishing house Gyldendal and a member of the board of the C. L. David Foundation.

== Awards ==
Tøjner received the N. L. Høyen Medal in 1998.

== See also ==
- Louisiana Museum of Modern Art
