= Dora Budor =

Croatian artist

- Born: Dora Budor; Croatia

Dora Budor is a Croatian artist who lives and works in New York. She has exhibited extensively throughout the U.S. and Europe.

== Early life and education ==
Budor was born in Zagreb in Croatia and lived there whilst she completed a BA in Architecture Studies (2003–2005) and an MFA from the Faculty of Architecture, University of Zagreb (2003–2008). Budor moved to New York in 2009 where she studied Visual Art (New Genres) at the MFA Program of Columbia University School of The Arts, New York, in 2012.

== Work ==
Budor's work has been shown internationally. Her first institutional solo exhibition in the United States was in 2015 at the Swiss Institute in New York, entitled Spring. The same year her works have been exhibited as part of Inhuman at Fridericianum in Kassel. In 2016 Budor exhibited immersive environment Adaptation of an Instrument for Dreamlands: Immersive Cinema and Art, 1905–2016, curated by Chrissie Iles, at the Whitney Museum. In 2017 Frieze Projects New York commissioned a new performance Manicomio! and her public sculpture The Forecast (New York Situation) was on view for a year as part of an outdoor exhibition Mutations on the High Line in New York. In 2018 she contributed site-specific installation The Preserving Machine for the 13th Baltic Triennial: Give up the Ghost, curated by Vincent Honore, at the Contemporary Art Centre (CAC), Vilnius, Lithuania.

She has participated in numerous institutional exhibitions; at Louisiana Museum of Modern Art (Denmark),Palais de Tokyo (Paris), David Roberts Art Foundation (London), La Panacee (Montpellier), Aïshti Foundation (Beirut), Museum of Contemporary Art (Belgrade), K11 Art Museum (Shanghai), Museum Fridericianum (Kassel), Halle für Kunst & Medien (Graz), as well as 9th Berlin Biennial (Berlin), Vienna Biennale (Vienna), and Art Encounters 2017 (Timișoara).

Budor was a recipient of Rema Hort Mann Foundation Grant in 2014 and Pollock Krasner Foundation Grant in 2018. In 2019, she was awarded Guggenheim Fellowship for Creative Arts.

== Selected exhibition history ==
- I am Gong, Kunsthalle Basel, Switzerland, 2019
- Benedick, or Else, 80WSE Gallery, NYU, New York, 2018
- Baltic Triennial 13, Give up the Ghost, Contemporary Art Centre (CAC), Vilnius, Lithuania, 2018
- Casa Tomada, Mexico City, Mexico, 2018
- Crash Test, La Panacée, Montpellier, 2018
- The Trick Brain, Aïshti Foundation, Beirut, Lebanon, 2017
- Being There, Louisiana Museum of Modern Art, Denmark, 2017
- Art Encounters 2017: Life a User's Manual, Timișoara, Romania, 2017
- Biennial of Contemporary Image / Mois de la Photo, Montreal, Canada, 2017
- (X) A Fantasy, David Roberts Art Foundation, London, UK, 2017
- Fade In 2: EXT. Modernist Home – Night, Museum of Contemporary Art, Belgrade, Serbia, 2017
- Le Rêve des formes, Palais de Tokyo, Paris, France, 2017
- Artificial Tears, Vienna Biennale 2017, MAK museum, Vienna, Austria, 2017
- Mutations, High Line Art, New York, US, 2017
- After Us, K11 Art Museum, Shanghai, China, 2017
- Ephemerol, Ramiken Crucible, New York, US, 2016
- Dreamlands: Immersive Cinema and Art, 1905–2016, Whitney Museum of American Art, New York, US, 2016
- Streams of Warm Impermanence, David Roberts Art Foundation, London, UK, 2016
- 9th Berlin Biennale, KW Institute for Contemporary Art, Berlin, Germany, 2016
- Spring, Swiss Institute, New York, US, 2015
- Inhuman, Fridericianum, Kassel, Germany, 2015
- DIDING – An Interior That Remains an Exterior?, Künstlerhaus / Halle für Kunst & Medien (KM–), Graz, Austria, 2015
