= Joakim Mæhle =

Danish footballer (born 1997)

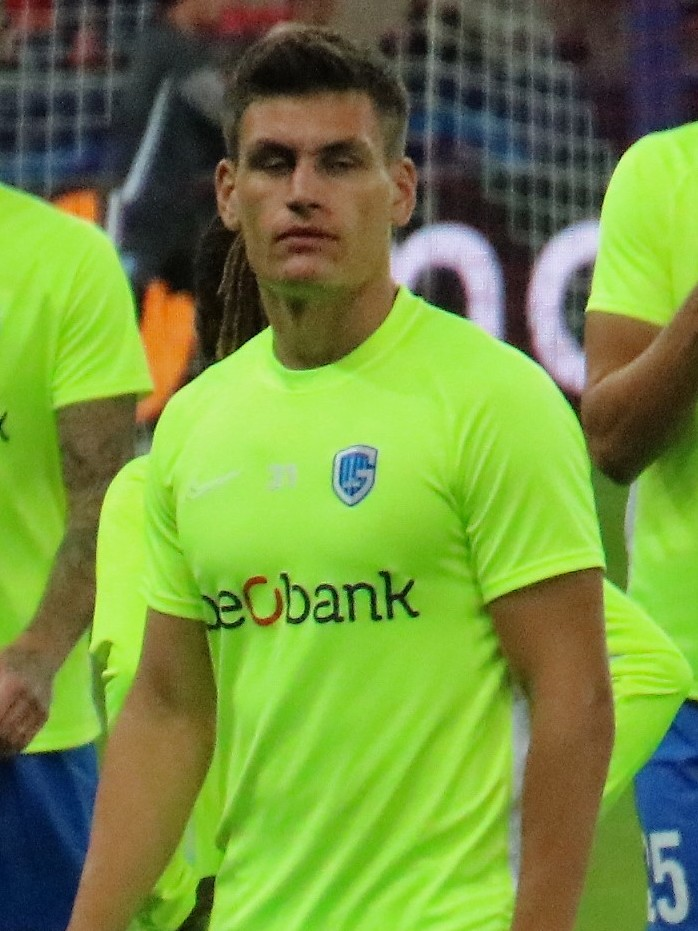
- Mæhle with Genk in 2019

Personal information
- Full name: Joakim Mæhle Pedersen
- Date of birth: 20 May 1997 (age 29)
- Place of birth: Østervrå, Denmark
- Height: 1.85 m (6 ft 1 in)
- Position: Full-back

Team information
- Current team: VfL Wolfsburg
- Number: 21

Youth career
- –2009: Østervrå IF
- 2009–2016: AaB

Senior career*
| Years | Team | Apps | (Gls) |
| 2016–2017 | AaB | 24 | (1) |
| 2017–2021 | Genk | 105 | (4) |
| 2021–2023 | Atalanta | 80 | (4) |
| 2023– | VfL Wolfsburg | 79 | (6) |

International career^{‡}
| 2017 | Denmark U20 | 1 | (0) |
| 2017–2019 | Denmark U21 | 7 | (2) |
| 2020– | Denmark | 65 | (12) |
- * Club domestic league appearances and goals as of 20:30, 18 September 2026 (UTC) ‡ National team caps and goals as of 22:00, 17 November 2026 (UTC)

Joakim Mæhle Pedersen (born 20 May 1997) is a Danish professional footballer who plays as a full-back for 2. Bundesliga club VfL Wolfsburg and the Denmark national team.

== Club career ==
=== AaB ===
Born in Østervrå, Vendsyssel, Mæhle started playing football with local club Østervrå IF and moved to the AaB youth academy as a 12-year-old. At the age of 19, Mæhle was promoted into the first team squad on 10 June 2016 and also signed a full-time senior contract with AaB. He made his debut for AaB on 7 August 2016. He started on the bench, but replaced Thomas Enevoldsen in the 89th minute in a 2–1 victory against FC Nordsjælland in the Danish Superliga.

On 11 November 2016, Mæhle earned a new contract until 2020. In April 2017, AaB confirmed that they were in negotiations with a foreign club about Mæhle.

=== Genk ===
On 9 May 2017, AaB confirmed that they had sold Mæhle to Belgian club Racing Genk for an undisclosed fee, starting from 1 July 2017. He was signed to succeed right-back Timothy Castagne, who had moved to Atalanta. Mæhle made his debut for Genk on 29 July 2017 in the first league match of the season against Waasland-Beveren as a substitute for Amine Khammas. In his first season with the club, he was not a fixed starter, competing with Clinton Mata for his position. In his second season, after Mata's departure to Club Brugge, he won a permanent starting position. That season, Mæhle grew into a key player in the Genk starting eleven. At the end of the season, Genk won the Belgian championship.

On 11 September 2019, Mæhle extended his contract until June 2023.

=== Atalanta ===
Genk announced on 22 December 2020 that Mæhle had signed for Atalanta on a five-year contract for a fee of €10 million. His transfer was made official on 4 January 2021. He made his Serie A debut for Atalanta on 6 January in the club's 3–0 win over Parma. On 28 February, Mæhle provided an assist in Atalanta's 2–0 win over Sampdoria. Mæhle scored his first goal for Atalanta in a 6–2 Serie A victory over Udinese on 9 January 2022.

=== VfL Wolfsburg ===
In August 2023, Mæhle joined VfL Wolfsburg for a fee of reportedly around €12 million. On 16 September 2023 he scored his first goal for the club in a 2–1 win against 1. FC Union Berlin.

== International career ==
Mæhle made his Denmark national team debut on 5 September 2020 in a Nations League game against Belgium; he substituted Martin Braithwaite in the 72nd minute of a 2–0 home loss. He scored his first international goal in a friendly against the Faroe Islands on 7 October 2020.

In June 2021, he was included in the national team's bid for 2020 UEFA Euro, where the team reached the semi-finals.

On 12 October 2021, Maehle scored the only goal as Denmark defeated Austria to secure a place at the World Cup in Qatar.

== Career statistics ==
=== Club ===
As of match played 18 September 2026

Appearances and goals by club, season and competition
| Club | Season | League | | | National cup (Note: Includes Danish Cup, Belgian Cup, Coppa Italia, DFB-Pokal) | | Europe | | Other | | Total | |
| Club | Season | Division | Apps | Goals | Apps | Goals | Apps | Goals | Apps | Goals | Apps | Goals |
|---|---|---|---|---|---|---|---|---|---|---|---|---|
| AaB | 2016–17 | Danish Superliga | 24 | 1 | 3 | 0 | – | | – | | 27 | 1 |
| Genk | 2017–18 | Belgian Pro League | 25 | 0 | 2 | 0 | – | | – | | 27 | 0 |
| Genk | 2018–19 | Belgian Pro League | 39 | 3 | 2 | 1 | 13 (Note: Appearances in UEFA Europa League) | 0 | – | | 54 | 4 |
| Genk | 2019–20 | Belgian Pro League | 25 | 0 | 2 | 1 | 6 (Note: Appearances in UEFA Champions League) | 0 | – | | 33 | 1 |
| Genk | 2020–21 | Belgian Pro League | 16 | 1 | 0 | 0 | – | | – | | 16 | 1 |
| Genk | Total | | 105 | 4 | 6 | 2 | 19 | 0 | – | | 130 | 6 |
| Atalanta | 2020–21 | Serie A | 20 | 0 | 3 | 0 | 2 | 0 | – | | 25 | 0 |
| Atalanta | 2021–22 | Serie A | 26 | 1 | 1 | 1 | 8 (Note: Five appearances in UEFA Champions League, three appearances and one goal in UEFA Europa League) | 1 | – | | 35 | 3 |
| Atalanta | 2022–23 | Serie A | 34 | 3 | 2 | 0 | – | | – | | 36 | 3 |
| Atalanta | Total | | 80 | 4 | 6 | 1 | 10 | 1 | – | | 96 | 6 |
| VfL Wolfsburg | 2023–24 | Bundesliga | 30 | 2 | 3 | 0 | – | | – | | 33 | 2 |
| VfL Wolfsburg | 2024–25 | Bundesliga | 28 | 3 | 3 | 0 | – | | – | | 31 | 3 |
| VfL Wolfsburg | 2025–26 | Bundesliga | 16 | 1 | 2 | 0 | – | | 2 (Note: Appearances in Bundesliga relegation play-offs) | 0 | 20 | 1 |
| VfL Wolfsburg | 2026–27 | 2. Bundesliga | 5 | 0 | 1 | 0 | – | | – | | 6 | 0 |
| VfL Wolfsburg | Total | | 79 | 6 | 9 | 0 | – | | 2 | 0 | 90 | 6 |
| Career total | | | 288 | 15 | 24 | 3 | 29 | 1 | 2 | 0 | 343 | 19 |

=== International ===
As of match played 17 November 2026

Appearances and goals by national team and year
| National team | Year | Apps | Goals |
|---|---|---|---|
| Denmark | 2020 | 6 | 1 |
| Denmark | 2021 | 17 | 7 |
| Denmark | 2022 | 11 | 1 |
| Denmark | 2023 | 8 | 2 |
| Denmark | 2024 | 8 | 0 |
| Denmark | 2025 | 5 | 0 |
| Denmark | 2026 | 10 | 1 |
| Total | | 65 | 12 |

Scores and results list Denmark's goal tally first, score column indicates score after each Mæhle goal.

List of international goals scored by Joakim Mæhle
| No. | Date | Venue | Cap | Opponent | Score | Result | Competition |
|---|---|---|---|---|---|---|---|
| 1 | 7 October 2020 | MCH Arena, Herning, Denmark | 2 | Faroe Islands | 3–0 | 4–0 | Friendly |
| 2 | 31 March 2021 | Ernst-Happel-Stadion, Vienna, Austria | 8 | Austria | 2–0 | 4–0 | 2022 FIFA World Cup qualification |
| 3 | 21 June 2021 | Parken Stadium, Copenhagen, Denmark | 13 | Russia | 4–1 | 4–1 | UEFA Euro 2020 |
| 4 | 26 June 2021 | Johan Cruyff Arena, Amsterdam, Netherlands | 14 | Wales | 3–0 | 4–0 | UEFA Euro 2020 |
| 5 | 1 September 2021 | Parken Stadium, Copenhagen, Denmark | 17 | Scotland | 2–0 | 2–0 | 2022 FIFA World Cup qualification |
| 6 | 9 October 2021 | Zimbru Stadium, Chișinău, Moldova | 20 | Moldova | 4–0 | 4–0 | 2022 FIFA World Cup qualification |
| 7 | 12 October 2021 | Parken Stadium, Copenhagen, Denmark | 21 | Austria | 1–0 | 1–0 | 2022 FIFA World Cup qualification |
| 8 | 12 November 2021 | Parken Stadium, Copenhagen, Denmark | 22 | Faroe Islands | 3–1 | 3–1 | 2022 FIFA World Cup qualification |
| 9 | 29 March 2022 | Parken Stadium, Copenhagen, Denmark | 25 | Serbia | 1–0 | 3–0 | Friendly |
| 10 | 7 September 2023 | Parken Stadium, Copenhagen, Denmark | 38 | San Marino | 2–0 | 4–0 | UEFA Euro 2024 qualifying |
| 11 | 17 November 2023 | Parken Stadium, Copenhagen, Denmark | 42 | Slovenia | 1–0 | 2–1 | UEFA Euro 2024 qualifying |
| 12 | 7 June 2026 | Odense Stadium, Odense, Denmark | 59 | Ukraine | 2–0 | 2–1 (Note: Denmark's friendly match against Ukraine was abandoned after 65 minutes with Denmark leading 2–1, due to Danish midfielder Christian Eriksen collapsing on the pitch.) | Friendly |

== Honours ==
Genk

- Belgian First Division A: 2018–19

Atalanta

- Coppa Italia runner-up: 2020–21
