= Gauri Gill =

Indian contemporary photographer (born 1970)

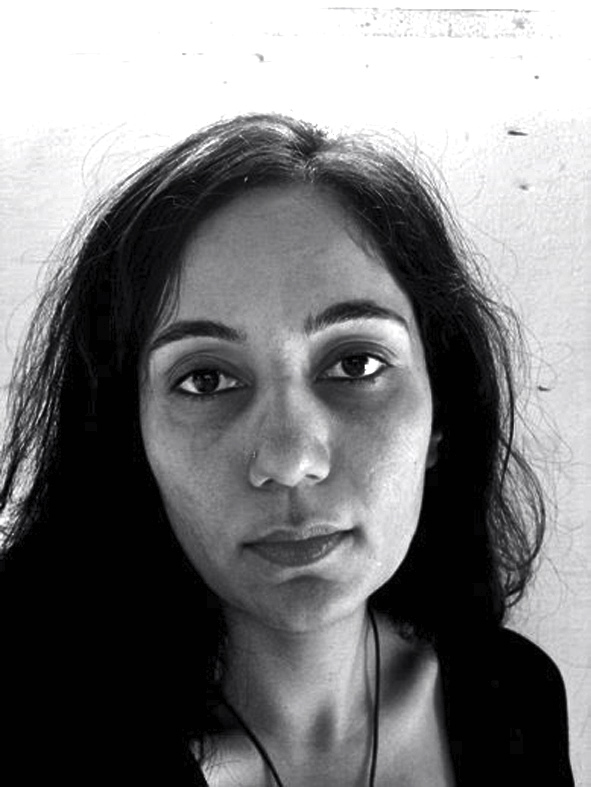
- Born: 1970 (age 55–56); Chandigarh, India
- Education: College of Art, Delhi University (B.F.A.); Parsons School of Design (B.F.A.); Stanford University (M.F.A.)
- Known for: Photography
- Website: gaurigill.com

Gauri Gill (born 1970) is an Indian contemporary photographer who lives in New Delhi.

In October 2022, Gill's first mid-career survey exhibition was held at the Schirn Kunsthalle Frankfurt, and subsequently travelled to the Louisiana Museum of Modern Art, Humlebæk, in January 2023. In 2018, she became the first Indian photographer to present a solo exhibition at MoMA PS1, New York. She also participated in Documenta 14, held in Athens and Kassel in 2017.

Gill received the Prix Pictet award for Photography and Sustainability in 2023 for her series Notes from the Desert. In the same year, she was nominated for the Deutsche Börse Photography Foundation Prize 2024. In 2011, she was awarded the Grange Prize for contemporary photography. The jury said her works "often address ordinary heroism within challenging environments depicting the artist's often-intimate relationships with her subjects with a documentary spirit and a human concern over issues of survival."

Gill has published two books documenting her collaborations with rural artists in India, Acts of Appearance and Fields of Sight, both published by Edition Patrick Frey, Zurich.

== Education and early life ==
Born in Chandigarh, India, Gauri Gill received her BFA in Applied Art at the Delhi College of Arts in New Delhi, India. She earned her BFA in Photography at the Parsons School of Design, New York in 1994, and MFA in Photography at Stanford University in 2002.

== Work and career ==
The Americans

Gill began the series The Americans (2000–2007) after noticing the limited visibility of South Asian communities in educational and museum contexts. The project documents South Asian individuals and families across the United States, exploring questions of identity and belonging, particularly in the period surrounding the events of 11 September 2001. The title intentionally references Robert Frank's The Americans (1958), which Gill has stated was intended to situate South Asian experience within the photographic canon.

Art critic Gayatri Sinha has written that the series examines the cultural and emotional dimensions of diaspora and migration. Anthropologist and art historian Christopher Pinney has described the project as offering multiple possible interpretations, noting its attention to everyday life, cultural continuity, and internal tensions within diasporic communities.

The Americans was Gill's first solo exhibition, and was shown at various locations within India and across the world from 2008–2009, including Bose Pacia Kolkata (16 February – 8 March 2008), Nature Morte, New Delhi (15–29 March 2008); Matthieu Foss Gallery, Mumbai (10 – 24 April 2008); Thomas Welton Art Gallery, Stanford University (8 July – 17 August 2008); Chicago Cultural Center, Chicago (4 October – 28 December); and Bose Pacia Gallery, New York (9 January – 14 February 2009).

Notes from the Desert

Notes from the Desert (1999–ongoing), is a long-term body of work documenting communities in rural Rajasthan. Begun in 1999, the open archive has resulted in individual exhibitions and projects drawn from it such as The Mark on the Wall, Traces, Birth Series, Jannat, Balika Mela and Ruined Rainbow.

The photographs from the series Notes from the Desert, are taken as Gill travels through Jaipur, Jodhpur, Osiyan, Bikaner, Barmer, Phalodi, Baran, Churu districts, photographing mainly in the villages of Western Rajasthan, but also across the State. The friends and acquaintances she made during her early visits, and to whom she returns again and again, become the subjects of her photographs. The series captures intimate realities and strategies for survival in precarious circumstances, all set in the difficult terrain of the desert. In Gill's own words: "I'm interested in how people find ways to swim and stay afloat; it's not about the drowning."

Through processes of subsequent editing of this large archive of over 40,000 negatives, Gill derives her sub-series.

In The Mark on the Wall (1999–ongoing), titled after Virginia Woolf's short story of the same name, Gill photographs drawings on school walls made by local artists, teachers and school children to help teach children visually from the classroom walls. With images showing numbers, seasons, anatomy, the English and Hindi alphabets and other pedagogical materials for young learners, these drawings were produced under the state's now lapsed Leher Kaksha government scheme, as well as subsequent similar government schemes. In the artist's own words, "From the most tentative marks to those ever more sophisticated, from determined depictions of children making their way to school to individualistic expressions of nature, from maps of the village to symbols of the State, in what these fragments choose to express—to represent, aspire to, or impart as learning—are offered revealing glimpses of the collective mind of a rural community."

Traces (1999–ongoing), memorialises marked and unmarked graves in the desert. Made using natural and found materials, these often discreet graves are very personal and often unrecognisable to outsiders. The graves are marked with stones, shards of pottery, hand-inscribed gravestones or personal items, which help cultivate memory and mark remembrance. Over time these ephemeral markers become one with the earth on which they were laid. The graves belong to both nomads and settled people, Hindus and Muslims, allied in their scarce access to resources.

The Birth Series (2005), consists of a set of circular photographs of the great midwife Kasumbi Dai who lived in the remote village of Motasar, Ghafan, taken as she delivers her granddaughter, a delivery which Gill ended up both photographing and assisting with. "For all its 'naturalness' and simplicity, as an event the birth has a solemn, almost meditative component, as expressed in the midwife's vividly lined, life-filled face." note the curators of the Tinguely exhibition.

In 2018, Gill's work was exhibited alongside Mengele-Totentanz (1986), an installation by Swiss artist Jean Tinguely created in response to a devastating fire near his studio. The exhibition explored the conceptual parallels between Tinguely's "ludic macabrism"—his tendency to counter themes of mortality with vital, kinetic energy—and Gill's documentation of life cycles in the desert of West Rajasthan.

In dialogue with Tinguely's exploration of faith and death, Gill selected two of her series, Traces and Birth Series, which examine memory, mortality, and the persistence of life within precarious environments. "Tinguely grappled with the concept of memento mori all his life, seeking invariably to answer death with life, and Gauri's photographs initiate a dialogue with his work, addressing his preoccupation with the subject of coming into being and passing away, with existential angst and extinction," said Roland Wetzel, director of Tinguely Museum, about the exhibition.

Jannat, made between 1999–2007 follows the life of Izmat, whom Gill met at the very beginning of her travels through Rajasthan, and who remains a close friend to this day, along with her two daughters. As Alexander Keefe notes, "Jannat affords an intimate glimpse into the life of a desperately impoverished and imperiled family on the very edge of India."

The series consisting of a circular narrative of 44 black and white images and 8 letters – a total of 52 pieces, "one for each week in the year, essentially" and it "... is really not so much a documentary of a particular individual or family's life, but more her experience of the kind of love that was felt in this family relationship. She (the artist) says it's a story of love, fundamentally," as quoted by curator Carol Huh who curated this series and other works from Notes from the Desert for an exhibition at the Smithsonian Institution in 2016, which was Gill's first major solo presentation in a Museum.

In 2003, Gill was invited by the non-profit organisation, Urmul Setu Sansthan, "to do something with photography" at the Balika Mela—a fair for girls—organised by them. In response, Gill set up a simple makeshift photo studio on site, for anyone to come and have their portrait taken and later buy the black-and-white silver gelatin print if they liked. Many girls came, some with their friends, some with their teachers, an odd few with their brothers, and many bringing along their own props to pose with. Of this work, she says, "The girls who come to the fair have an urge to know. Those who stepped into my photo tend also wished to portray themselves, as they are, or as they see themselves, or to invent new selves for the camera. Their attempts may have been tentative or bold, but this book may be seen as a catalogue of that desire."

In 2010, Gill attended the Balika Mela again, and exhibited the images taken in 2003. She also took more portraits, but this time in colour.

Ruined Rainbow (1999–2010) consists of photographs derived from rolls of film made by children in villages in Barmer district while participating in photography activities organised during Gill's visits. Some of the film rolls were accidentally exposed to light and subsequently discarded as unusable. In 2010, Gill revisited these negatives while editing material for the exhibition Notes from the Desert and incorporated the images into the project. The resulting photographs, marked by light leaks and colour distortions caused by accidental exposure, form the basis of the series, which reflects on chance, authorship, and the role of accident in photographic processes.

Jannat was exhibited at Asia Centre, London; Houston Photo Festival; Balika Mela at Goa Photo Festival; Birth Series at Birla Academy Kolkata, The Mark on the Wall in Documenta, Epigraphic Museum, Athens and Ruined Rainbow at the Art Institute of Chicago; among other places. In 2011 she won the Grange Prize, Canada's most prestigious contemporary photography award. This award, founded by the Art Gallery of Ontario and Aeroplan in 2007, nominates two Canadian and two international photographers from a selected country (from India in 2011). The four nominated photographers are invited for a residency at the AGO and the final winner is selected by public voting after an online and offline exhibition of works held on the AGO premises by all the nominated photographers. Gill was announced as the recipient of the Prix Pictet award for Photography and Sustainability for the series ‘Notes from the Desert' on 28 September 2023 at a ceremony held at the V&A Museum in London.

Rememory

In 2003, Gill also began documenting the semi-rural urban settlements and mofussil towns of Rajasthan, and which later grew to include suburbs and satellite towns from Mumbai, Delhi, and other large and cosmopolitan metropolises; and which eventually came together under the series Rememory, the title borrowed from Toni Morrison. The black-and-white photographs focus on "negative spaces," peripheries, and the aesthetic "encroachments" between rural and urban environments. Often devoid of human figures, the photographs still reflect their complex psychology as they seamlessly adopt elements from sterile global designs, merging them with traditional and home grown environments, to create hybrid and inventive architectures, ones that reflect the globalised aspirations and constantly changing dreams of their inhabitants. The series further examines the resulting social dislocations, including the displacement of migrant workers and the fundamental reshaping of the natural landscape to meet human desire.

In an essay on the series, urban theorist Gautam Bhan describes Rememory as documenting the everyday material environments of urban India. He argues that, rather than presenting the built environment as a fixed record of power and planning, Gill's photographs depict urban spaces as evolving, provisional, and shaped by everyday use. According to Bhan, the series presents the city as a collection of incomplete and layered developments, forming a fragmented archive that reflects the contingent and ongoing nature of urban settlement rather than a single historical narrative.

Works from this series were shown at the 58th Venice Biennale (2019), Kiran Nadar Museum of Art, New Delhi (2023) and Ishara Art Foundation, Dubai (2024).

1984 Notebook

With images shot in 2005, 2009, 2014 and 2019, the 1984 notebook (2005–ongoing) is a free to download notebook reflecting upon the memories and impact of the anti-Sikh pogrom which occurred in New Delhi in 1984. Containing the photographs taken by Gill and presented along with the original captions or reports accompanying them in Indian print media, the notebook also has text responses by forty one artists–including writers, poets, and film makers– solicited by Gill in response to her pictures to create a dialogue within her community of artists–"It could be a direct response to the photograph, or a more general observation related to the event; it could be tangential, poetic, personal, fictional, factual or nonsensically true in the way that were Toba Tek Singh's seminal words on the partition" she writes in her essay in the notebook. Images and texts from the series were presented at The Weiner Holocaust Library in 2014 and have since been shown at the Centre Pompidou, Paris (2017) and Chennai Photo Biennale (2021).

Camerawork Delhi

In December 2006, along with Sunil Gupta and Radhika Singh, she co-founded and edited Camerawork Delhi a free newsletter about independent photography from New Delhi and elsewhere. Camerawork Delhi centered around independent photography and critical discourse on the medium, at a time where there were scarce resources for critical dialogue and when photography as a practice itself was undergoing a major shift from analog to digital. Camerawork Delhi was one of the first non-commercial platforms for photographers experimenting with the medium to share their work and ideas. It included writings in English by independent photographers, writers, lab workers, printers, and many others from within the medium to spread further awareness about ongoing practices. It also shared local information on exhibitions, grants, competitions and reviews of ongoing or recently concluded exhibitions. The newsletters were only disbursed in print and were displayed specifically in areas visited by young people like coffee shops and bookshops, or in gatherings where there were slide shows and conversation over samosas and chai. The initial copies were free, however issue VII and VIII were made available at INR 50. Having run for eight issues, the newsletter closed down near the end of 2011 due to a scarcity of funding and since it was not taken up by a university or other such institution at the time.

Curatorial Projects

Gill photographed 25 activists from across India for the book 1,000 PeaceWomen Across the Globe, a project documenting women collectively nominated for the 2005 Nobel Peace Prize. This included figures such as Aruna Roy, Medha Patkar, Shahjana Apa, Mahasweta Devi, the Naga Mothers, Irom Chanu Sharmila, Maya John Ingty, Maninder "Meenu" Sodhi, among other key activists. She collaborated with the feminist network Sangat in 2005 to curate a traveling exhibition of these portraits, which toured New Delhi, Kashmir, and Northeast India.

The same year Gill curated the exhibition Nobody's Children? Myth / Reality at the Visual Arts Gallery, featuring photographs by Tarun Chabra that documented the lives of street children with dignity rather than pity. A collaboration with the NGO Youthreach, the project functioned as a fundraiser to support health initiatives for children living at the New Delhi Railway Station.

In 2010, she curated an exhibition called Transportraits: Women and Mobility in the City investigating safety and experiences of women on the streets. This multi-artist exhibition for Jagori at the Alliance Française Gallery, New Delhi held in conjunction with the 2010 Delhi Declaration on Women's Safety featured works by artists like Amruta Patil, Priya Sen, Ruhani Kaur and Uzma Mohsin; and the collectives Blank Noise and Lucida, in collaboration with the young people of Madanpur Khadar. It later traveled to educational institutions nationwide.

Sheher, Prakriti Devi (2021/2024)

In 2021, Gill curated the first iteration of Sheher, Prakriti, Devi, including works by her, Vinnie Gill and Ladhki Devi, which was on view at Galerie Mirchandani + Steinruecke, Mumbai. The exhibition explored the intersections of urban landscapes (Sheher), as represented in Gill's practice, nature (Prakriti), as represented in Vinnie Gill's practice, and the spiritual or feminine divine (Devi), as represented in Ladhki Devi's practice. At its core was Gauri Gill's "Rememory" series, which documents the "unintended" and hybrid nature of urban India, moving away from modernist planning to focus on intimate, improvised built environments. These photographic fragments are interlaced with Vinnie Gill's fluid, decades-long visual diary of the botanical and animal worlds, alongside Ladhki Devi's Warli paintings that depict the miraculous and devotional in everyday life. As Mario D'Souza writes about this exhibition, "... the three artists come together to celebrate inherited knowledge and the tender modes of care emerging from matrilineal kinship." Both Vinnie Gill and Ladhki Devi's works had not been exhibited in a formal or institutional setting before, despite lifelong practices.

In 2024, she curated the second and more extensive iteration of Sheher, Prakriti, Devi at Ishara Art Foundation, Dubai. Bringing together the works of twelve women artists and collectives from a variety of contexts– "urban, rural, domestic, communitarian, public and non-material spaces"– many never exhibited before, the exhibition explored the relationship between the urban, nature and the inseparable sacred.

In her curatorial essay, Gauri Gill states that the exhibition seeks to acknowledge artists who "stubbornly persist" in their practice outside of traditional art markets and global discourses. She describes the collection of works as a "palimpsestic" gathering that explores dualities—such as the "depleted and regenerative, manmade and natural, colonial and Indigenous, young and old, English and non-English, mundane and magical, absent and present"—to challenge existing structures of exclusion. Ultimately, Gill aims to "enlarge the circle" of who is defined as an artist and what constitutes art practice, expanding the possibilities for how art is both created and recognized.

Fields of Sight

Since 2013, she has collaborated with Rajesh Vangad, a Warli artist, on Fields of Sight, combining the contemporary language of photography with the ancient one of Warli drawing to co-create new narratives. In early 2013, Gill was invited by an NGO organising an arts festival to Ganjad village in Dahanu, where she lived in the home of Rajesh Vangad, who was also a participating artist. In the course of working on that project, she also began to photograph the landscape around her. In conversation with Rajesh Vangad, whose family had lived in the area, Vangad Pada, for generations, they began to discuss his village. Tentatively, Gill started photographing places significant to Vangad, often with him present in the frame. Later, when looking at the contact sheets, Gill realised that much of the stories – generational histories, mythologies, and personal narratives – Vangad had shared with her were missing in these frames. In response, she asked Vangad to inscribe her large format black and white photographic prints with his monochromatic drawings made with brush and ink.

Gill describes the collaboration as a dialogue between two distinct artistic languages: one rooted in ancient traditions and the other in contemporary photography. While Rajesh Vangad draws from a mental "encyclopedia" of myth and memory to construct forms, Gill uses the physical world as her source, editing existing structures to reflect her internal vision. The resulting works merge these "fields of sight" into a single perspective, creating a multi-layered narrative that a viewer once likened to a resident emerging from a photographed house to tell its story.

In her essay on the series, Dr. Inderpal Grewal notes that the work "decenters the perspective of power" by replacing the traditional gaze with Vangad's own, often positioning him within the frame to mediate the viewer's vision. Grewal observes that Vangad populates the landscape with stories of "loss, power, ethics, and the politics of land," moving beyond "picturesque" or "pristine" depictions of nature. Instead, the collaboration insists on a "decolonized" viewing that centers the narratives of those who have been "displaced" or "seen as non-modern." Ultimately, Grewal suggests that Gill's photographs serve as a "setting and a match for Vangad's intensities."

Fields of Sight was first shown at Experimenter Gallery, Kolkata in 2014 and works from the series have since been exhibited in exhibitions like Documenta 14, Kassel (2017), Prospect.4, New Orleans (2017), National Gallery of Canada, Ottawa (2019). In 2025, Gill and Vangad presented new works from the series—Dawning, Dwelling, and Dissolution—in the group exhibition Planetary Peasants at Kunstmuseum Moritzburg Halle (Saale). This project invited 30 artists to explore the intersection of contemporary agricultural practices and the legacy of the German Peasants' War. Concurrently, from 2025 to 2026, The Eye in the Sky (2016) from the series Fields of Sight (2013–ongoing) was featured in the group exhibition Gathering Ground at Tate Modern, London. Featuring works from the Tate Collection, this exhibition examined the intersection of environmental issues and social justice. The curation explored the shifting relationships between human society and the natural environment, specifically highlighting the impact of land displacement and the degradation of waterways. The works shown utilize Indigenous knowledge systems and queer multispecies frameworks to address these themes and propose alternative ways of coexisting with the environment.

Gill and Vangad released a book about this series with Edition Patrick Frey, which was later nominated for the Deutsche Borse Photography Foundation Prize 2024.

Acts of Appearance

In 2015, Gill began working on another collaborative series Acts of Appearance. Through her regular visits to Maharashtra working on Fields of Sight with Rajesh Vangad, she had heard about the Bohada masks and the Bohada festival, an annual Adivasi ritual where members of Warli and Kokna tribes wear consecrated papier-mâché masks to enact scenes from Hindu epics and local myths. Reflecting on the gap between these idealized deities and the community's contemporary lived experience, Gill invited local mask-makers Subhash and Bhagvan Dharma Kadu, along with a whole community of fellow practitioners in the village, to expand their craft. Rather than depicting god and demons, the artisans were commissioned to create secular masks representing familiar beings in the village, with human emotions and experiences common to all. Animals were understood to be a part of this universe, and later everyday objects like cell phones and televisions also found representation. The resulting color photographs depict community members wearing these masks while engaged in quotidian activities, ‘across dreaming and waking states’, in and around the village.

In her analysis of the series, curator Natasha Ginwala describes the work as a collective, improvisational practice that utilizes the village—including public hospitals, shops, and bus stops—as "animated backdrops." Ginwala notes that the series maintains a "fragile balance between estrangement and belonging," using the masks to subvert modern "filtered" portraits and digital self-representation. She argues that the collaboration proposes an "ontology of the otherwise," where the masked beings address collective survival and vulnerabilities. By navigating the space between the hidden and the revealed, Ginwala suggests the photographs act as a "groundwork of resistance" that challenges traditional hierarchies of visibility and self-image.

This series was first shown at Documenta 14, Kassel; and later at Nature Morte, New Delhi (2018); MoMA PS, New York (2018); Bangkok Art Biennale, Bangkok (2018); 58th Venice Biennale, Venice (2019); Columbus Museum of Art, Ohio (2019); Sydney Opera House, Sydney (2019); Aargauer Kunsthaus, Aarau (2019); Momenta Biennale de l'image, Montreal (2019) and NGV Triennial, Victoria (2023) among others. This series was also published as a book by Edition Patrick Frey, Zurich in 2022.

First Survey Show: Gauri Gill. Acts of Resistance and Repair

Gill's first large-scale survey show, curated by Esther Schlict, was held at the Schirn Kunsthalle Frankfurt in October 2022, and subsequently travelled to the Louisiana Museum of Modern, Humlabaek in January 2023 where it was curated by Tine Colstrup. The exhibition brought together over 240 works from many of Gill's major series and also included various collaborations, including selections of photographs by her father, Manohar Singh Gill; drawings by her mother, Vinnie Gill; Warli drawings by Ladhki Devi and Rajesh Vangad, alongside documentations of collaborative projects like her films On Seeing (2020) and Paper to Figure (2022, with Pradip Saha).

The Village on the Highway

In early 2025, Gill presented The Village on the Highway at the Vadehra Art Gallery in New Delhi, marking the most comprehensive exhibition of the series to date. A selection of works were first shown at the Victoria and Albert Museum (V&A) in London as part of a print commission to inaugurate the 2023 reopening of its Photography Centre.

The series documents the 2020–2021 Indian farmers' protest, specifically focusing on the makeshift settlements established by farmers on the highways leading into New Delhi. Gill has stated that she did not initially visit the sites as a photographer, but rather went "just to see for myself what was going on" and to extend solidarity to the movement. She subsequently began documenting the structures she encountered, which she described as "an unusual, handmade and homegrown architecture of resistance," where agricultural vehicles—such as tractors, trolleys, and tempos—were transformed into functional living quarters. Writing for the Financial Times in February 2025, Snigdha Poonam observed that the series captures the sudden emergence of a domestic infrastructure on formerly vacant transit routes. Poonam noted that the protesters effectively conjured an entire social ecosystem—comprising bedrooms, storage areas, and communal facilities like libraries and medical clinics—where none had previously existed.

Rather than capturing the political spectacle or individual protesters, Gill utilized a large-format analog camera to document the material culture of the site. Her photographs highlight the ingenious spatial strategies used for survival: tarpaulin sheets serving as walls, bamboo scaffolding forming partitions, and highway dirt being reconfigured for planting vegetables. The presentation of the series at the Vadehra Art Gallery and Paris Photo 2025 incorporated physical materials from the protest sites to frame the photographs. This immersive staging was intended to emphasize the resourceful and urgent use of limited rural materials in the construction of the settlements.

Curator Marta Weiss of the V&A noted that the work "explores design creativity in the face of urgent necessity," framing the protest as a narrative of rural workers utilizing their tools for survival.

== Exhibitions ==
- The Village on the Highway, Vadehra Art Gallery, New Delhi, 2025
- Gathering Ground, Tate Modern, London, 2025
- Deutsche Börse Photography Foundation Prize 2024, The Photographers' Gallery, London; Deutsche Börse Photography Foundation, Frankfurt, 2024
- Sheher, Prakriti, Devi, Ishara Art Foundation, Dubai, 2024
- The Village on the Highway, Print commission for the opening of the Photography Centre, Curated by Dr Marta Weiss, Victoria & Albert Museum South Kensington, London, 2023
- RE/SISTERS: A Lens on Gender and Ecology, Barbican Art Gallery, London, 2023.
- Prix Pictet Exhibition: Human, Victoria and Albert Museum, London, 2023.
- Maps of Disquiet, Chennai Photo Biennale 2021, curated by Arko Datto, Boaz Levin, Kerstin Meincke and Bhooma Padmanabhan, Chennai, 2021
- May you live in Interesting Times, Curated by Ralph Rugoff, Venice Biennale, Venice, 2019
- Chennai Photo Biennale: Fauna of Mirrors, Curated by N. Pushpamala, Chennai, 2019
- Chobimela, Dhaka, 2019
- Project 108: Gauri Gill, MoMA PS1, New York, 2018
- Documenta 14, Athens and Kassel, 2017
- 7th Moscow Biennale, Clouds⇋Forests, Curated by Yuko Hasegawa, New Tretyakov State Gallery, Moscow
- Prospect 4: The Lotus In Spite Of The Swamp, Artistic Director Trevor Schoonmaker, New Orleans, 2017
- Kochi-Muziris Biennale, Curated by Sudarshan Shetty, Kochi, Kerala, 2016

== Publications ==
Gill has published three monographs with the Zurich-based publisher Edition Patrick Frey. These bilingual publications document her long-term collaborative projects and often include extensive textual contributions in both English and Hindi from the artists and communities involved.

Balika Mela

Published following a solo exhibition at Nature Morte, New Delhi, this monograph documents the makeshift photo studio Gill set up at a rural fair for girls in Lunkaransar, Rajasthan. The book is a collection of 72 black-and-white and 32 color plates produced during the 2003 and 2010 iterations of the fair. It functions as a record of a collaborative portraiture project where the subjects chose their own poses and props. The volume features bilingual essays in English and Hindi by Gill and Manju Saran, who had learnt photography from Gill during workshops she held in the village and had later gone on to establish her own successful photo studio.

- Details: 115 pages, 26.4 × 19.3 cm, Hardcover. ISBN 978-3-905929-16-4.

Acts of Appearance

This softcover volume documents series Acts of Appearance initiated in 2015 in a village of the Kokna and Warli tribes in Maharashtra. The book catalogs a series of photographs featuring community members wearing papier-mâché masks that represent contemporary life rather than traditional deities. The publication includes 126 color images and emphasizes the collaborative nature of the work by including essays by Gill and Yuvraj Bhagvan Kadu, one of the young artists from the community.

- Details: 188 pages, 30.5 × 20.5 cm, Softcover. ISBN 978-3-907236-46-8.
- Republished in 2025: 188 pages, 24 × 16.1 cm, Softcover. 978-3-907236-90-1.

Fields of Sight

Created in collaboration with Warli artist Rajesh Vangad, this book presents a "visual dialogue" between photography and traditional Warli drawing. The publication is structured around Gill's black-and-white landscape photographs of Ganjad, which have been hand-inscribed by Vangad with intricate ink drawings. The book serves as a formal and conceptual exploration of the land, addressing environmental destruction, Indigenous history and rural experiences through the merging of two distinct artistic languages.

- Details: 372 pages, 29 × 21 cm, Hardcover. ISBN 978-3-907236-47-5.
- Republished in 2025: 372 pages, 22.8 × 16.5 cm, Hardcover. ISBN 978-3-907236-89-5.
