= Louisiana Museum of Modern Art =

Coordinates: 55°58′10″N 12°32′35″E

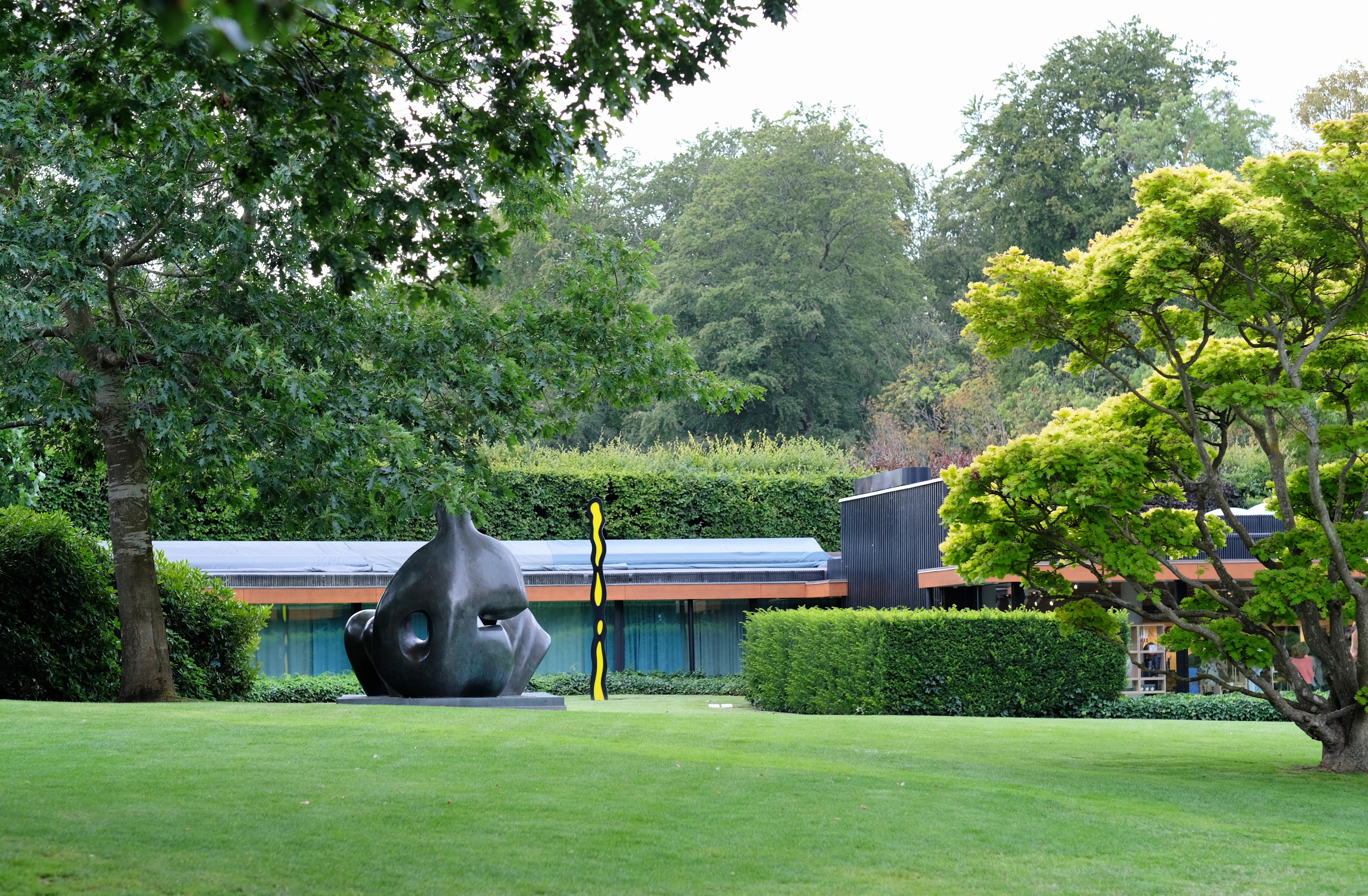
- The garden and façade of the building facing the sea of the Øresund sound.
- Established: 1958
- Location: Humlebæk, Denmark
- Type: Art museum
- Collection size: 4,500
- Visitors: 715,820 (2024)
- Founder: Knud W. Jensen
- Director: Poul Erik Tøjner
- Chairpersons: Lars Henrik Munch; Dorte Mandrup-Poulsen (vice)
- Architects: Jørgen Bo; Wilhelm Wohlert; Claus Wohlert
- Public transit access: Humlebæk Station
- Parking: On site
- Website: louisiana.dk

The Louisiana Museum of Modern Art, (Note: The official name of the museum is also "Louisiana Museum of Modern Art" in Danish, it is not translated into Danish.) also known as the Louisiana, is an art museum located north of Copenhagen, Denmark. Attracting over 700,000 guests annually, the Louisiana is Scandinavia's most visited museum for modern and contemporary art, hosting 6 to 10 exhibitions each year alongside a permanent display of Yayoi Kusama's Gleaming Lights of the Souls. The museum is recognized as a modernist landmark in Danish architecture, and is noted for its synthesis of art, architecture and landscape. The museum's sculpture park features works by Alexander Calder, Henry Moore and Richard Serra. In addition to its permanent and temporary exhibitions, the museum has a shop featuring Danish design items, a restaurant with a view of the Øresund, and a three-storey Children's Wing hosting daily workshops. The museum is included in Patricia Schultz's book 1,000 Places to See Before You Die.

== Location ==
The museum is located by the Øresund coast in the North Zeeland region, some 30 km (19 mi) north of central Copenhagen and 10 km (6 mi) south of Elsinore. From the regional train station in Humlebæk, it takes 10–15 minutes to walk to the museum.

== Exhibitions ==
Since 1958, the Louisiana has presented international art and culture to a Danish and international audience. The annual programme features 6-10 temporary exhibitions. In 2026, the museum will present exhibitions by Jean-Michel Basquiat, Sophie Calle, Lucian Freud, Remedios Varo and Tracey Emin. Between 2020 and 2025, the museum hosted exhibitions by artists and architects including Jon Rafman, Marisol, Bouchra Khalili, Kaari Upson, Robert Longo, Alexej Jawlensky, Roni Horn, Franz Gertsch, Chaïm Soutine, Firelei Báez, Pussy Riot, Cave_bureau, Ragnar Kjartansson, Nan Goldin, Niko Pirosmani, Andy Warhol, Dana Schutz, Gauri Gill, Richard Prince, August Sander, Alex Da Corte, Dorothy Iannone, Forensic Architecture, Diane Arbus, Sonia Delaunay, Peter Cook, Jens Adolf Jerichau, Mika Rottenberg, Pia Arke, Mamma Andersson, Arthur Jafa, Troels Wörsel, Taryn Simon, Anupama Kundoo, Tetsumi Kudo, Per Kirkeby, and Nancy Spero. The museum has also showcased large-scale interdisciplinary exhibitions focusing on the Arctic, the Moon, the Ocean, and other topics.

== Collections ==
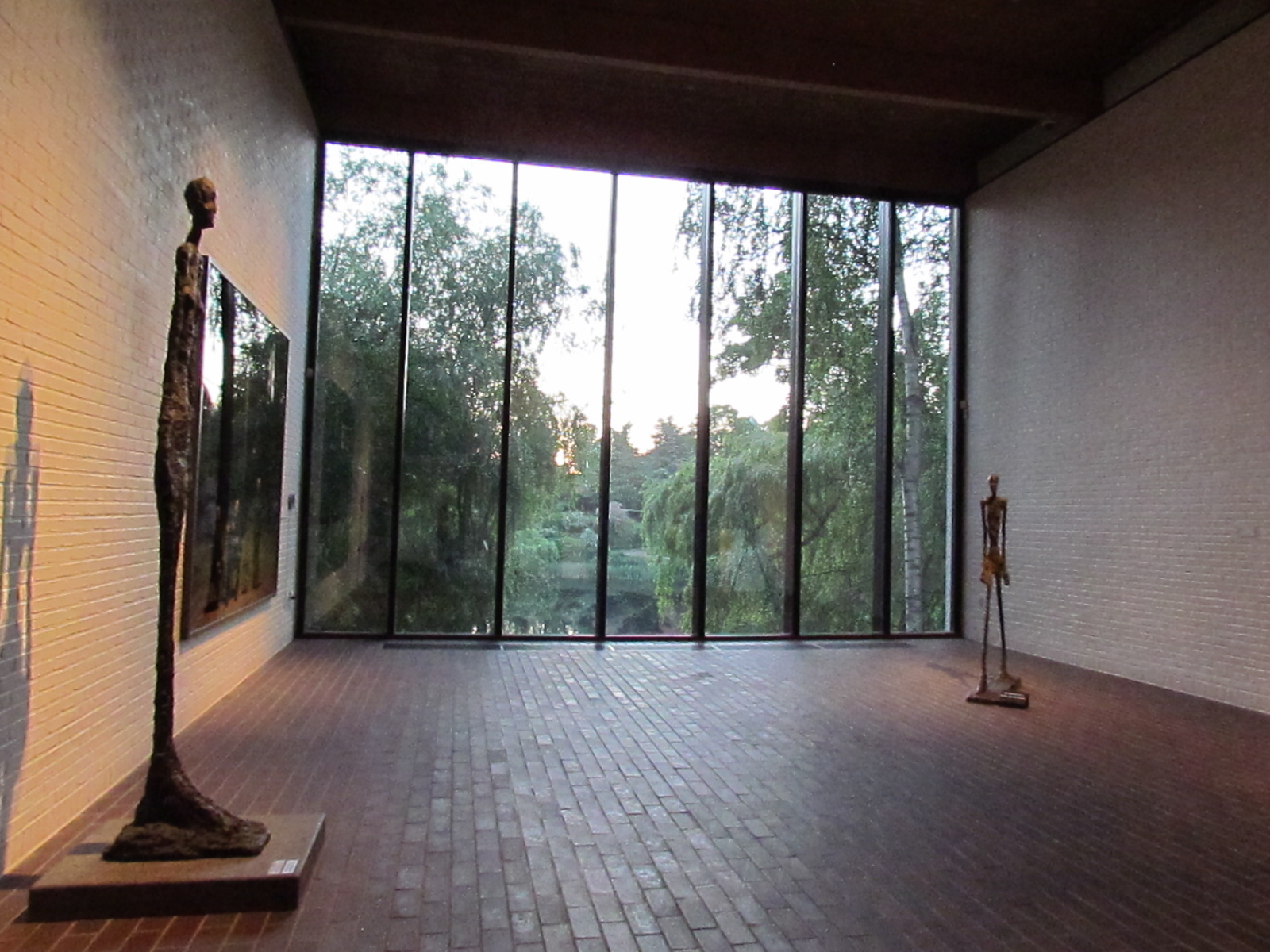
A room in Louisiana with sculpture works from Alberto Giacometti

=== Modern art ===
The museum has a wide range of modern art paintings, photographic works, sculptures and videos dating from World War II onwards, including works by artists such as El Anatsui, Alberto Giacometti, Louise Bourgeois, Andy Warhol, Diane Arbus, Roy Lichtenstein, Anselm Kiefer, Francesca Woodman, Pablo Picasso, Philip Guston, Yves Klein, Susan Rothenberg, Robert Rauschenberg, Germaine Richier, David Hockney, Gerhard Richter, and Asger Jorn. Perched above the sea, there is a sculpture garden between the museum's two wings with works by artists including Henry Moore, Alexander Calder, and Jean Arp.

=== Contemporary art ===
Recent acquisitions span a wide range of media and artistic expressions, featuring works by artists such as Roni Horn, Yayoi Kusama, Pipilotti Rist, William Kentridge, Marina Abramović, Cecily Brown, Dana Schutz, Sophie Calle, Alex Da Corte, Malene Dumas, Nan Goldin, Shilpa Gupta, Ragnar Kjartansson, Mona Hatoum, Arthur Jafa, Cindy Sherman, Richard Prince, Ann Veronica Janssens, Amy Sillman, Jon Rafman, Tal R, Michel Majerus, Catherine Opie, Superflex, Rosemarie Trockel, Bouchra Khalili, Gauri Gill, Dora Budor, and Nina Beier.

== Louisiana Channel ==
Louisiana Channel is a non-profit web TV channel launched in 2012. According to New York Times, "No museum has used streaming video more ambitiously than the Louisiana Museum of Modern Art". According to The Art Newspaper Louisiana "punches hugely above its weight on its broadcast channel, going far beyond art and consistently featuring leading writers, musicians and architects. Louisiana does deep dives particularly well: a documentary about Ulay and Marina Abramović is exemplary, and a series of films in which artists including David Salle and Tal R discuss the influence of the painter Marsden Hartley reflects the incisiveness artists can bring to understanding the work of their forebears."

== Louisiana Literature Festival ==
Launched in 2010, the Louisiana's literary festival, Louisiana Literature, celebrates exceptional writing from around the globe. Each year, the festival features about forty writers, who perform on stages around the museum and in the sculpture park, attracting more than 15,000 people each year. From 2022 to 2024, the festival featured authors such as Adania Shibli, Rachel Cusk, Kim de l'Horizon, Anne Boyer, Anne Carson, Colm Tóibín, Danez Smith, Haruki Murakami, Joyce Carol Oates, Ali Smith, Tessa Hadley, Ian McEwan, Abdulrazak Gurnah, Wole Soyinka, Ocean Vuong, Torrey Peters, Deborah Levy, Laurie Anderson, Benjamín Labatut, Bernardine Evaristo, Édouard Louis, and Natasha Brown.

== History ==
=== Building a museum of modern art ===
A few times a year, we read in the newspapers that now some city or municipality wants to have its own Louisiana, and there's only one reply to that: Even if you can create a building, you cannot create a Knud W. Jensen.

— Jørgen Sthyr, New Carlsberg Foundation, 1968

The history of the museum goes back some 170 years. The name of the museum is derived from the first owner of the property, hofjægermester Alexander Brun, who named the estate after his three wives, all called Louise. Brun built the villa in which the part of the museum resides in 1855. A hundred years later, in 1955, businessman and cheese wholesaler Knud W. Jensen purchased the villa and surrounding property after a failed attempt to purchase land around Rungstedlund. In 1952, Jensen founded the Art at the Workplace association, leasing artworks to companies.He claimed conventional art museums to be alienating and uninviting, citing the National Gallery of Denmark as a typical example. He felt that grandiose architecture did not fit for modern art and aimed to create a museum with an "appropriate atmosphere" wherein people "...feel obliged [...] to approach the works of art." He took his inspiration from American museums, such as the Museum of Modern Art.

I have not been able to learn much about Alexander Brun, the Master of the Royal Hunt who built Louisiana in 1855, but enough so that I can form a picture of him. He was married three times, and each time he found a girl named Louise, which was perhaps a fashionable name then. It's a good story, which has also been told many times. It was natural to preserve this lovely name. I could not very well call it Humlebæk Museum of Modern Art or Jensen Museum instead. People would die laughing. So, better to let them smile at the curious and poetic name "Louisiana", which most people thought had something to do with the state of Louisiana in America.

— Knud W. Jensen, The Spirit of the Place (Stedets ånd), 1994

Wishing to instead create a museum on a "human scale" that was close to nature, he first approached Jørn Utzon to design the museum; however, Utzon was already commissioned to design the now iconic Sydney Opera House, and so he declined. In lieu of this, he partnered up with architects Vilhelm Wohlert and Jørgen Bo, who spent a few months walking around the property before deciding how a new construction would best fit into the landscape. This study resulted in the first version of the museum consisting of three buildings connected by glass corridors, which opened in conjunction with the museum as a whole, in 1958. The first exhibition had several faults according to Jensen himself, the building lacked climate control and the storage room was insufficient. The museum received criticism, from among others, the Swedish newspaper Dagens Nyheter, who referred to the newly opened museum as "Cirkusiana". Jensen intended for the museum to be mixture between art, architecture, and nature; music, film, dance, and political debates would all take place at the Louisiana. Critics posited that the other forms of entertainment would ultimately distract from the art itself, though Jensen stated that art was not the entire focus of the venue. The decision to have a café built into the museum was also controversial, Jensen stated in an interview that "good drinking and food is very important in connection with experiencing art." His personal ideas and ambitions largely steered the development of the museum, despite the existence of a board of directors. He has emphasized the idea of the Louisiana as a cultural center, "I believe much more in the idea of a cultural center than [that] of a museum." Shortly after opening, the Louisiana became known in the international art world for its at times controversial exhibitions; the museum has used the self-coined "sauna-princippen" (lit. 'the sauna principle'), a combination of uncontroversial "warm" and transgressive "cold" exhibitions. One such controversy was a Nam June Paik concert which ended chaotically and with largely negative reactions from the crowd. These controversies nonetheless garnered attention for the Louisiana; Jensen expected 40,000 visitors in the first year, the museum received 200,000.

=== International outlook ===
Up until 1959, the works featured at the Louisiana were primarily Danish in origin. During Jensen's visit to the art exhibition Documenta II in Kassel, Germany, he saw the works Alberto Giacometti, Alexander Calder, and Henry Moore. He described it as a "Documenta shock", and decided to try and persuade the board of directors to start featuring international art at the Louisiana. He eventually succeeded, despite the skepticism of the board; at the time there was no internationally inclined modern art museum in Denmark. The art exhibition affected him to such an extent that he organized the exhibition Works from Documenta just weeks after the show was hosted.

The decision to feature international art has later been hailed as "decisive" by art historian Kristian Handberg, and the exhibitions of international art have become a hallmark of the museum; it fostered a "new Louisiana", with new exhibition halls being constructed for the international exhibitions. Among these were Vitality in Art and Movement in Art, composed by Willem Sandberg, along with Jean Tinguely's manifesto Sketch for the End of the World. These exhibitions brought together contemporary artists from both the United States and Europe. Handberg has stated that the achievement of bringing the Louisiana into the wider European circulation of international art exhibitions on the part of Jensen is a "remarkable" feat. The Louisiana gained the status of state-authorized museum in 1968, and began to receive financial support from the Danish state. It had by this point begun to receive criticism from younger artists who considered the museum to be "old fashioned" and lacking the latest art. It has nevertheless continued to feature modern and contemporary art through its exhibitions, featuring the likes of Nouveau Réalisme, Pop art, and Minimalist art.

The collection of the museum includes several pieces made specifically for it, Roy Lichtenstein's Figures in Landscape was painted in 1977 following a visit to the museum. Similarly, Sam Francis created a series of paintings for the museum during his visit in 1979, and Jim Dine's painting for a specific room in the museum.

=== Louisiana in the 21st century ===
Since Poul Erik Tøjner became director in 2000, the Louisiana has earned a place on the international stage as an institution that is both artistically and economically successful. Each year, the museum hosts 6 to 10 temporary exhibitions alongside live events, a festival, and new digital initiatives that broaden its reach. Since 2010, the Louisiana Literature festival has hosted forty writers annually across the museum and sculpture park, while the Louisiana Channel, launched in 2012, shares weekly art and culture videos to engage new generations and promote cultural understanding.

In 2023, the Louisiana finalized its 2050 sustainability strategy, focusing on climate, circularity, biodiversity, and social responsibility. It aims to reduce greenhouse gas emissions in line with the Paris Agreement's 1.5 °C goal, with targets verified by the Science Based Targets initiative. Recognized as a "Green Attraction," the museum is recognized for its efforts in advancing sustainable practices within the cultural sector.

== Architecture ==
Each work demands to be seen without too much competition from other works of art and without a restrictive landscape setting.

— Knud W. Jensen

The architecture of the Louisiana is considered to be an instrumental part of the museum experience, and has been used as a point of comparison to other buildings. Architects Vilhelm Wohlert and Jørgen Bo were contacted by Knud W. Jensen to design the new museum building. At first Jensen had contacted Jørn Utzon to design the museum, who himself owned a house in nearby Hellebæk. However, as Utzon was busy with working on his later successful design for the Sydney Opera House, he declined the offer. Wohlert and Bo's study of the property over the course of several months resulted in the first version of the museum consisting of three buildings connected by glass corridors, which opened in 1958 and is designated as the Nordfløj (North Wing). A clear source of inspiration for this building was the Kings Road House by Rudolph Schindler in Los Angeles, along with Richard Neutra's Bailey House in Pacific Palisades. The building was subsequently expanded with the addition of the Vestfløj (West Wing) in 1966 and again in 1971, collectively adding two more floors. The change in architectural direction with the expansion of the Sydfløj (South Wing) in 1982, is largely the result of the increasing size and dimensions of the works of art in the exhibitions. According to Jensen, large portions of the permanent collection had to be stored away for most of the year, as to make room for the temporary exhibitions; the much larger spaces of the South Wing are in that sense "tailor-made for the international collection", in Jensen's own words.

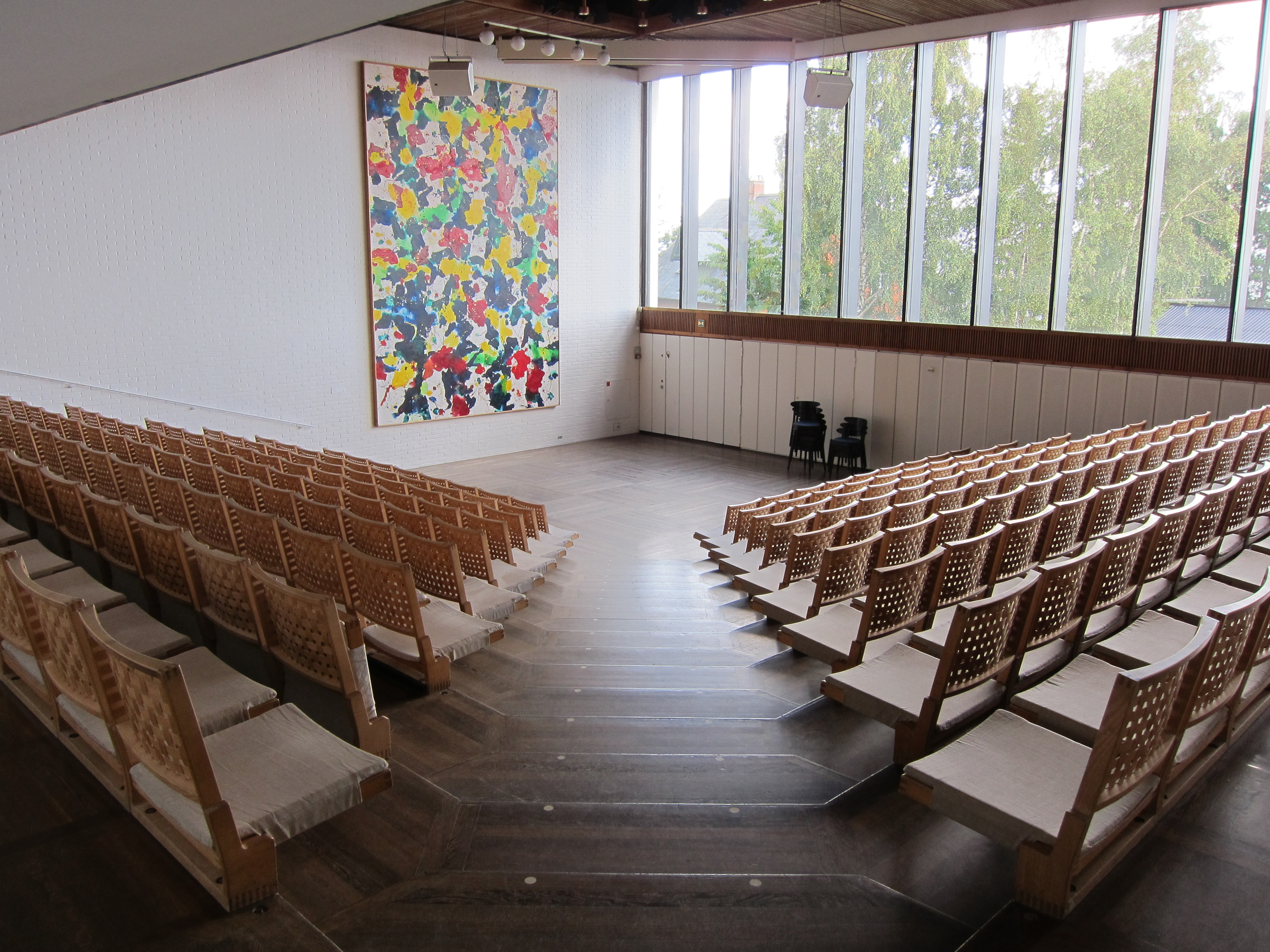
Concert hall of the Museum

=== Concert hall ===
In 1976 the concert hall was inaugurated, connected to the North Wing. Its acoustics make it especially suitable for chamber music, but it is also used for other musical genres as well as a wide array of others events and activities such as debates, lectures and symposiums. The chairs are designed by Poul Kjærholm. The museum hosts an active concert programme featuring world-famous classical musicians such as Grigory Sokolov, Arcadi Volodos, Emmanuel Pahud and Midori Gotō.

== Sculpture garden ==
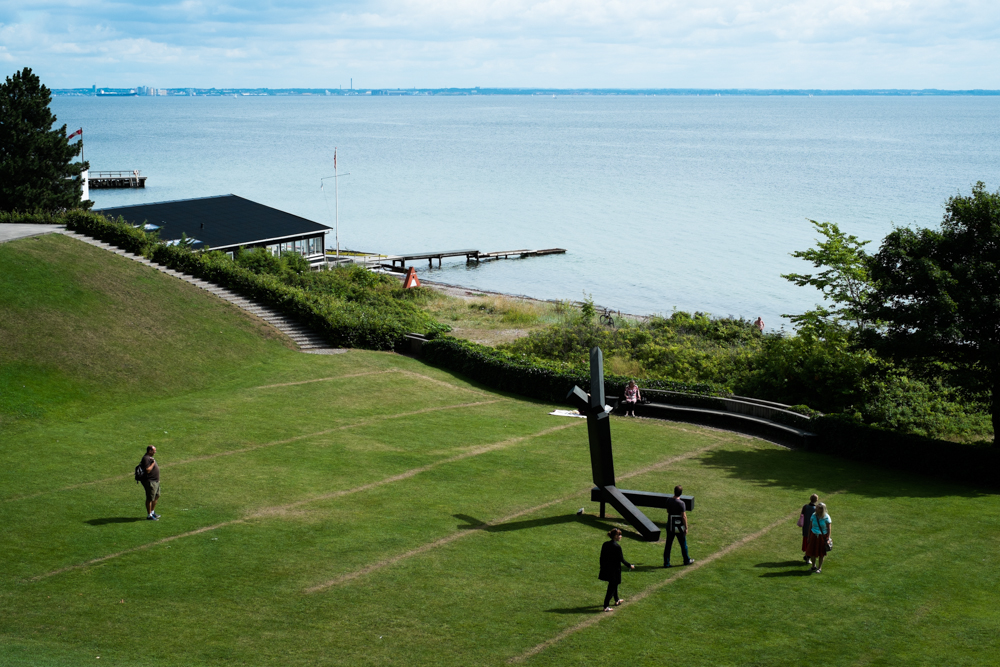
Part of the sculpture park of the museum, in the background the Øresund sound can be seen.

The grounds around the museum contain a landscaped sculpture garden. It consists of a plateau and ground that slopes towards the Øresund and is dominated by huge, ancient specimen trees and sweeping vistas of the sea. It contains works by such artists as Jean Arp, Max Ernst, Max Bill, Alexander Calder, Alicja Kwade, Henri Laurens, Joan Miró and Henry Moore. The sculptures are either placed so that they can be viewed from within, in special sculpture yards or independently around the gardens, forming a synthesis with the lawns, the trees and the sea.

== Directors ==
- 1958 —1993: Knud W. Jensen
- 1995 —1998: Lars Nittve
- 1998 —2000: Steingrim Laursen
- 2000 —: Poul Erik Tøjner

== Partners and sponsors ==
The Louisiana is an independent institution receiving government grants. However, the vast majority of the museum's funding comes from its own revenue, bolstered significantly by support from partners, sponsors, and foundations such as the A.P. Møller og Hustru Chastine Mc-Kinney Møllers Fond til almene Formaal, Augustinus Fonden, C.L. Davids Fond og Samling, Realdania, and Ny Carlsbergfondet.
