= Louisiana Channel =

- Logo of the channel
- Type: Web-based TV
- Country: Denmark
- Broadcast area: Worldwide

Ownership
- Owner: Louisiana Museum of Modern Art

History
- Founded: 2012

Links
- Website: channel.louisiana.dk

Louisiana Channel is a non-profit web TV channel launched in 2012 and based at the Louisiana Museum of Modern Art in Humlebæk, Denmark. The channel has developed into the world’s largest archive of contemporary art, featuring the artists, with videos available on the channel's website, Instagram, and YouTube. "No museum has used streaming video more ambitiously than the Louisiana Museum of Modern Art", writes New York Times. And The Art Newspaper concludes that the Louisiana "punches hugely above its weight on its broadcast channel, going far beyond art and consistently featuring leading writers, musicians and architects. Louisiana does deep dives particularly well: a documentary about Ulay and Marina Abramović is exemplary, and a series of films in which artists including David Salle and Tal R discuss the influence of the painter Marsden Hartley reflects the incisiveness artists can bring to understanding the work of their forebears."
