= Tomomi Adachi =

- Born: Tomomi Adachi; 1972 (age 53–54); Kanazawa, Japan
- Genres: musical improvisation; experimental music; dance-pop
- Occupations: Singer-songwriter, composer, instrument maker
- Years active: 1994-present

Tomomi Adachi (足立 智美, Adachi Tomomi; born 1972 in Kanazawa, Ishikawa) is a Japanese vocal and electronics performer, composer, and instrument builder.

He has performed and recorded with artists such as Jaap Blonk, Nicolas Collins, Carl Stone, Noah Creshevsky, Yuji Takahashi, Toshi Ichiyanagi, Ute Wassermann, Jennifer Walshe, Zbigniew Karkowski, Butch Morris, Otomo Yoshihide. Adachi directed Japan's premiere of John Cage's Europera V and Variations VII. He was invited by Asian Cultural Council to New York from 2009 to 2010 and was a guest of the DAAD Berliner Künstlerprogramm in 2012.
