= Knud W. Jensen =

Danish museum director

Knud John Peter Wadum Jensen (7 December 1916 - 12 December 2000) was the founder of the Louisiana Museum of Modern Art in Denmark.

== Life ==
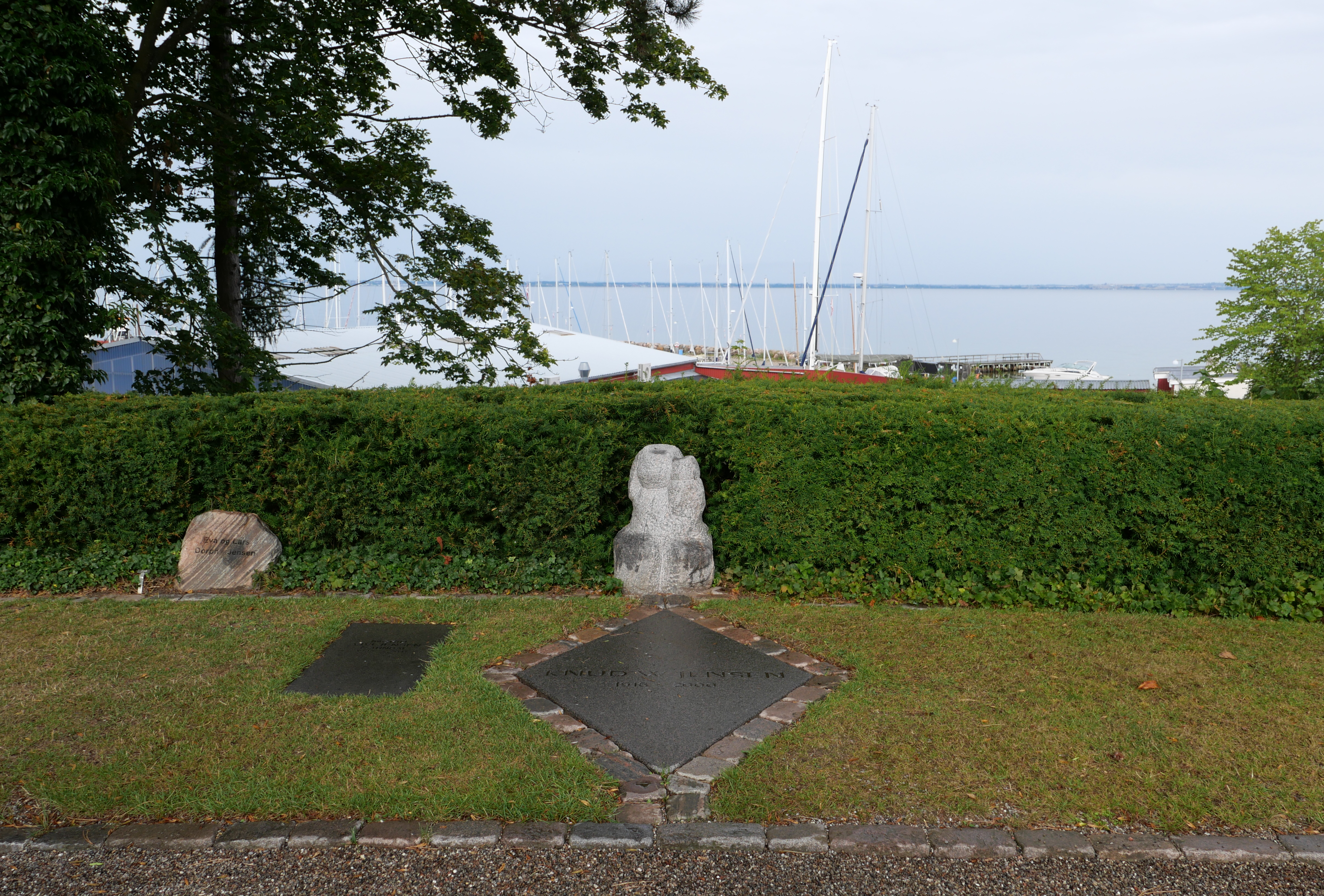
The graves of Jensen (center) and his second wife Ingrid Vivi, née Arndal (1923-2011), at the cemetery of Humlebæk

Between 1936 and 1938, Knud W. Jensen studied language and commerce in Germany, Switzerland, France, Belgium, and the United Kingdom before he joined his father's company, Ost en gros, in 1939.

Knud W. Jensen died on 17 December 2000, at the age of 84.
