= Poul Kjærholm =

Danish designer (1929–1980)

- Born: 8 January 1929; Østervrå, Denmark
- Died: 18 April 1980 (aged 51); Hillerød, Denmark
- Spouse: Hanne Kjærholm

Poul Kjærholm (1929–1980) was a Danish designer. Born in Østervrå, Denmark, Kjærholm began his career as a cabinetmaker's apprentice with Gronbech in 1948, attending the Danish School of Arts and Crafts in Copenhagen in 1952. In 1953, he married Hanne Kjærholm who became a successful architect. While working as a designer, he also became an educator continuing studies with Prof. Erik Herløw and Prof. Palle Suenson.

== Life ==
From the mid-1950s he worked for his friend Ejvind Kold Christiansen, for whom he produced an extensive range of his furniture. His distinctive style is evident as early as 1952 in his PKO minimalist plywood series. The PK61 coffee table of '55 is a playfully irrational supporting frame visible through the glass top.

In 1958 he attracted international acclaim for his contributions to the 'Formes Scandinaves' exhibition in Paris and the award of the legendary 'Lunning Award', the same year for his PK22 chair. In both 1957 and 1960 he won the Grand Prize at the Milan Triennale.

In 1959 he became assistant at the Royal Danish Academy of Fine Arts in Copenhagen and lecturer.In 1965 his PK24 Chaise Longue typified his mature style. Its simple flowing lines combine steel and woven cane. In 1967 he was awarded the Danish ID Prize for product design.

He became head of the Institut for Design in 1973 and finally professor in 1976 until his death 4 years later.

== Works ==
Most of his furniture was initially produced by his friend E. Kold Christensen in Hellerup. Since 1982 a wide selection of those products have been produced by Republic of Fritz Hansen, a leading Danish furniture manufacturing firm. His designs are in the permanent collection of the Museum of Modern Art in New York, the Victoria and Albert Museum in London and other museum collections in Denmark, Norway, Sweden and Germany.

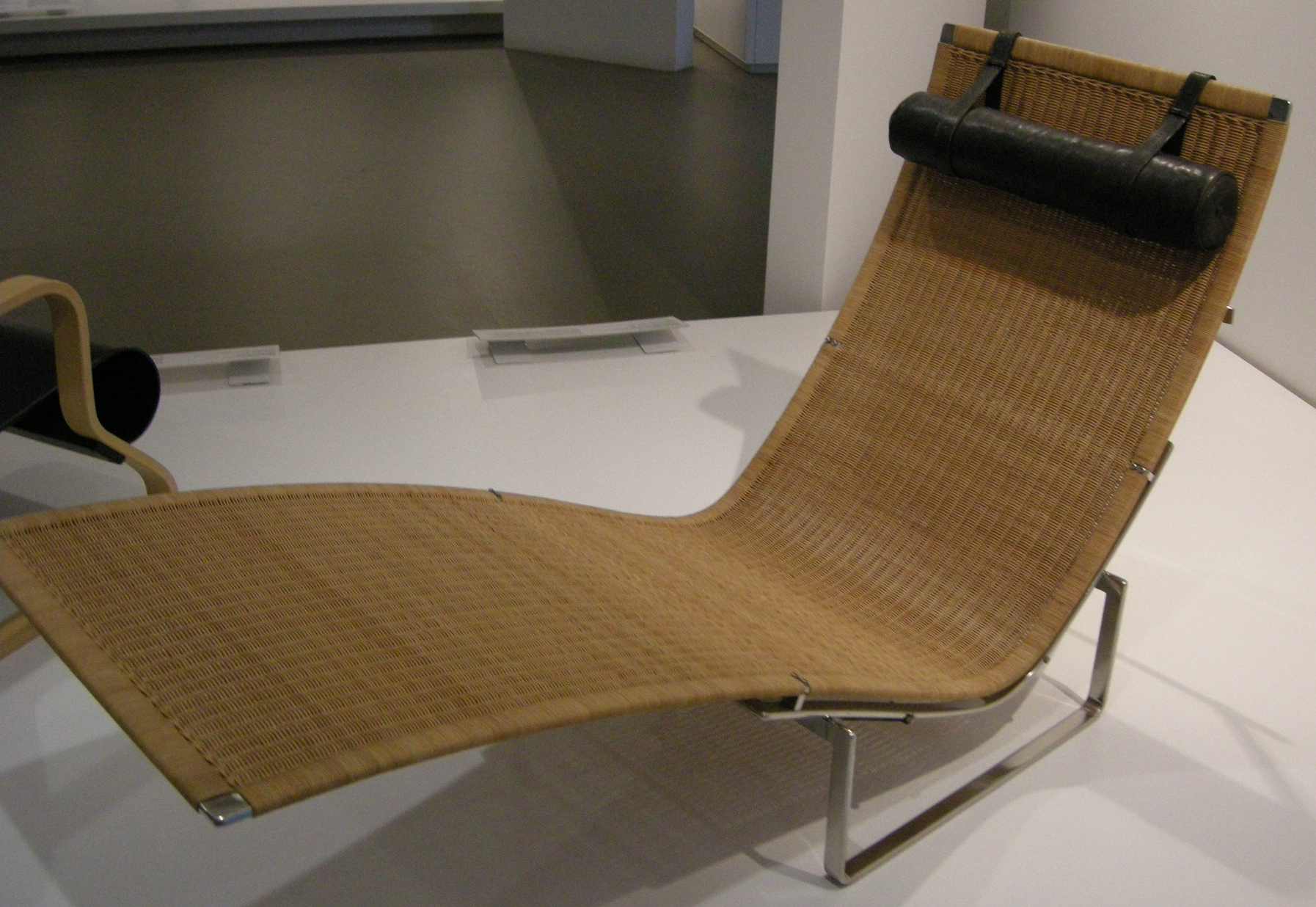
Hammock chair, 1965

In typically Scandinavian fashion, most of Kjærholm’s contemporaries opted for wood as their primary furniture construction material. Kjærholm chose steel as his primary, but always combined it with other materials such as wood, leather, cane or marble. "Steel’s constructive potential is not the only thing that interests me; the refraction of light on its surface is an important part of my artistic work. I consider steel a material with the same artistic merit as wood and leather," he commented.

He has been referred to as a “furniture architect” as he used functional models to make his finalized works. Furniture that he created between 1951 and 1980 has been described as “profound essays on the relationship between the body, materials, and space.”

In 2004, Kjærholm's son established Kjærholm Productions to produce those items of his father's furniture that Fritz Hansen had discontinued production of in 2003.

In 2008, Gregory R. Miller & Co. published the comprehensive and definitive reference work, The Furniture of Poul Kjærholm: Catalogue Raisonné, by Michael Sheridan.

Some works:

- Lounge chair "PK25" (1951/52, production start in 1956): made on one single sheet of steel. cover done using sailing cord/rope like called "flag halyard"
- Coffee table "PK61" (1955) : made to match PK22, top can be in glass/marble/granite/slate
- Lounge chair "PK22"(1956): famous and well known
- Day Bed "PK80" (1957)
- Tripod stool "PK33"(1959) : same construction technique as on daybed PK80 (top & feet sticks together using rubber rings)
- The Tulip Chair (1961)
- X Stool "PK91" (1961): ball bearing crossing
- Hammock chair "PK24"(1965): "Chaise Longue", reversible structure
- Rocking Chair "PK20" (1967)

== Publications ==
- Nils Fagerholt: Poul Kjaerholm (English Edition), Arktitektens Forlag, Copenhagen 1999, ISBN 978-87-7407-206-5
