= Coloplast =

Danish medical devices manufacturer

Coloplast A/S
- Type: Publicly traded Aktieselskab
- Traded as: Nasdaq Copenhagen: COLO B
- Industry: Health care
- Founded: 1957; 69 years ago
- Founder: Aage Louis-Hansen
- Headquarters: Humlebæk, Denmark
- Key people: Gavin Wood (CEO) Niels Peter Louis-Hansen (Deputy chairman)
- Products: Ostomy bags, continence products, urology products, wound dressings
- Revenue: DKK18.544 billion (2019/2020)
- Operating income: DKK5.854 billion (2020/2021, before special items)
- Total assets: DKK13.499 billion (September 2021)
- Total equity: DKK5.928 billion (September 2021)
- Number of employees: 12,500 (FTE, September 2021)
- Subsidiaries: Kerecis
- Website: coloplast.com

Coloplast A/S is a Danish multinational company that develops, manufactures and markets medical devices and services related to ostomy, urology, continence, and wound care.

== History ==
Coloplast was founded in 1957 by Aage Louis-Hansen. His son Niels Peter Louis-Hansen owns 20% of the company and is deputy chairman. It employs more than 12,000 people and operates around the world, with sales activities in 53 countries and production in Denmark, Hungary, France, China, and the US. It has its global headquarters in Humlebæk, Denmark. Its United States operations and North American headquarters are based in Minneapolis, Minnesota. The company manufactures and supplies products to hospitals and institutions, as well as wholesalers and retailers. In selected markets, Coloplast is a direct supplier to consumers.

The company had revenues of DKK 18.554 billion (US$2.45 billion) in 2020/2021. Europe constitutes its biggest market with 63% of sales, while 22% of sales are in North America and 15% in the rest of the world. Coloplast is listed on the Danish Stock Exchange, and has for a number of years been represented among the 20 most-traded shares in the country.

In 2016, Coloplast was listed as the 22nd most innovative company in the world (and among the 10 most innovative in Europe) by Forbes, after being listed by the magazine as 33rd the year before. The company has been featured in Star Tribune's annual list of top employers in Minnesota.

== Acquisitions ==
In 2010, the company acquired Mpathy Medical Devices.

In November 2016, Coloplast acquired Comfort Medical for US$160 million. Comfort Medical was a direct-to-consumer medical supplier based in Coral Springs, Florida. Prior to the acquisition by Coloplast, Comfort Medical had acquired Medical Direct Club as well as Liberty Medical's urological division in 2015. In 2020, Coloplast announced the acquisitions of Hope Medical and Rocky Medical Supply, and integrated the organizations into Comfort Medical.

In November 2021, Coloplast announced the acquisition (from PAI Partners) of Atos Medical and its laryngectomy technology for €2.16 billion (US$2.49 billion).

In July 2023, Coloplast agreed to acquire Kerecis, an Icelandic company that makes fish-skin-based products for wound care, for about US$1.3 billion; the acquisition was completed on 31 August 2023.

== Transvaginal surgical mesh lawsuits ==
In 2019, the US Food and Drug Administration ordered Coloplast and Boston Scientific to halt the sale and distribution of transvaginal surgical mesh implants for failure to prove their mesh products were safe and effective for the repair of pelvic organ prolapse. Coloplast was one of several companies that had previously settled multimillion-dollar lawsuits for damages caused by transvaginal mesh implants.
