= Kokkedal =

Settlement and municipal seat north of Copenhagen, Denmark

Coordinates: 55.908°N 12.490°E

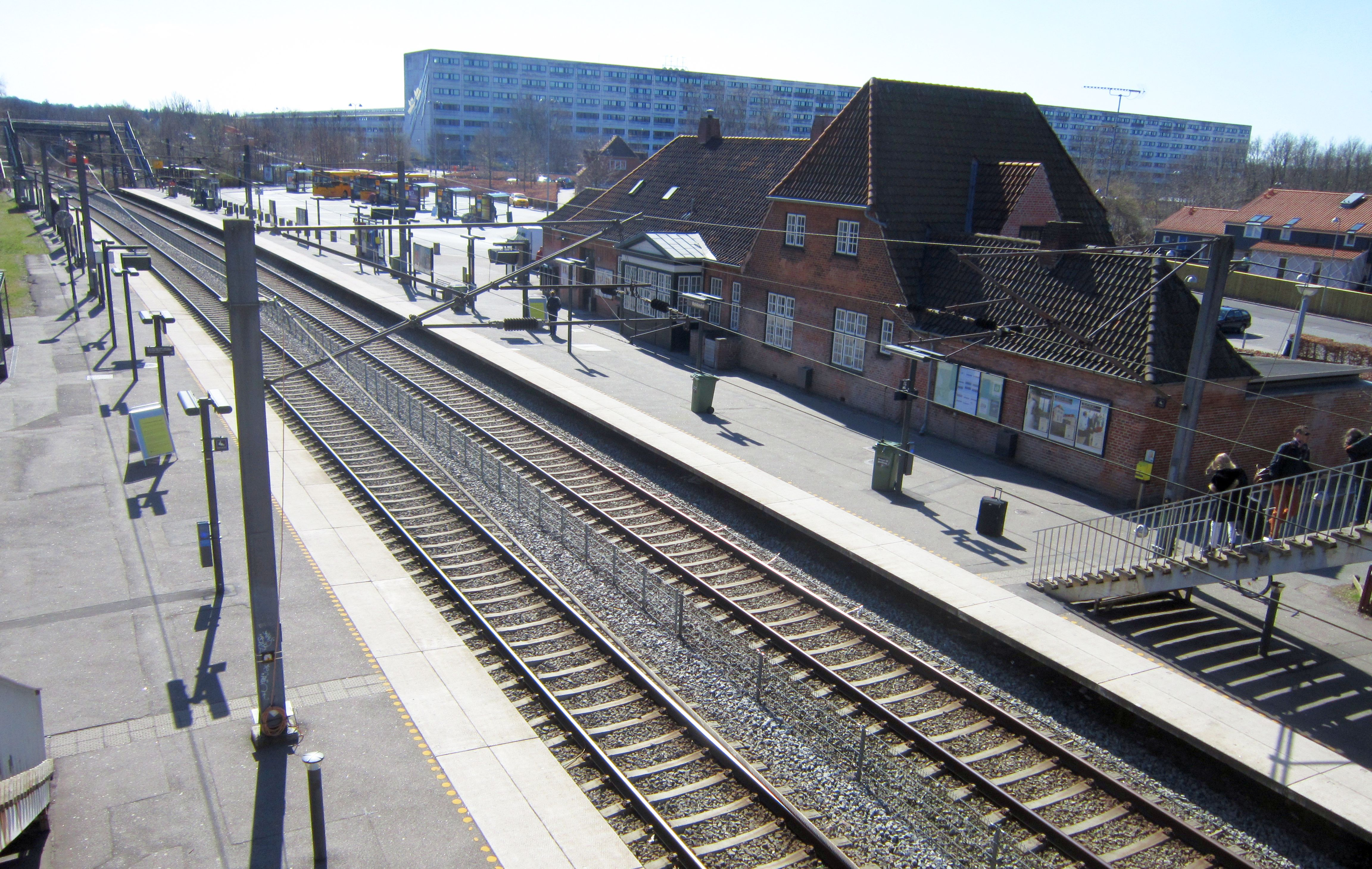
Kokkedal station

Kokkedal (Danish pronunciation: [ˈkʰʌkəˌtɛˀl]) is the municipal seat of Fredensborg Municipality and a northern settlement in the urban area of Hørsholm, located on the coastline of northern Zealand, Denmark, between the two towns, Nivå and Hørsholm, 30 km north of Copenhagen. The settlement is connected with the Kystbanen towards Helsingør to the north and Copenhagen to the south, with extensions to some major cities in Zealand (Roskilde, Køge, Næstved).

== History ==
Kokkedal was previously the seat of Karlebo Kommune until the reform of the Danish Municipalities and Regions in 2007, as a result of the Municipal Reform in 2007 (Kommunalreformen (2007)).

== Demographics ==
Kokkedal has, like Nivå, a high number of second & third generation immigrants, most of them with Turkish or Arab roots.56% of the population are either immigrants or Danish citizens with immigrant parents and 44% are native Danes.

== Notable people ==
- Cecilia Iftikhar (born 1987 in Kokkedal) competitor in Miss Earth 2011

=== Sport ===
- Michael Mørkøv (born 1985 in Kokkedal) a Danish professional racing cyclist
- Jesper Morkov (born 1988 in Kokkedal) a Danish male track and road cyclist
- Mads Valentin (born 1996 in Kokkedal) a footballer who plays for Swiss club FC Zürich
- Oliver Kjærgaard (born 1998 in Kokkedal) a Danish footballer
