= Karlebo Kommune =

Former municipality in Denmark

Coordinates: 55°55′N 12°25′E

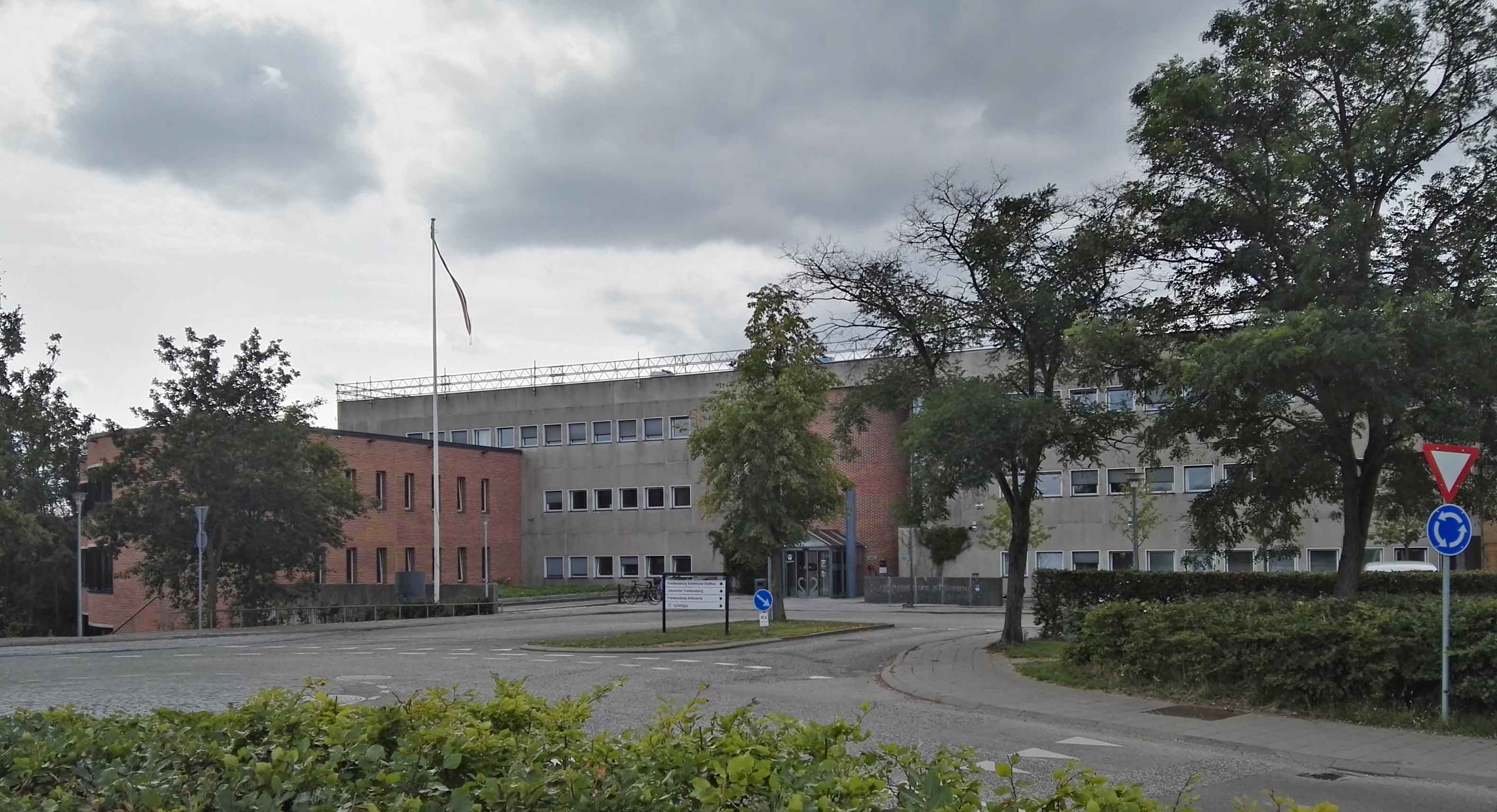
The former Karlebo Rådhus (town hall) in Kokkedal, now part of Fredensborg Kommune

Karlebo Kommune was until 1 January 2007 a municipality (Danish, kommune) in Frederiksborg County on the east coast of the island of Zealand (Sjælland) in eastern Denmark.

The municipality covered an area of 40 km², and had a total population of 19,163 (2005). Its last mayor was Olav Aaen, a member of the Venstre (Liberal Party) political party.

The main town and the site of its municipal council was the town of Kokkedal. Other towns in the municipality were Kirkelte, Karlebo, Gunderød, Avderød, Hesselrød, Vejenbrød, and Nivå.

Karlebo municipality ceased to exist as the result of Kommunalreformen ("The Municipality Reform" of 2007). It was merged with existing Fredensborg-Humlebæk Kommune to form the new Fredensborg Kommune. This create a municipality with an area of 112 km² and a total population of 39,187 (2005). The new municipality belongs to Region Hovedstaden ("Capital Region").

== Cultural references ==
Karlebo Windmill is used as location for the fictional restaurant known as Maxim at 0:38:16 in the 1978 Olsen-banden film The Olsen Gang Sees Red..
