= Nivå railway station =

Railway station in North Zealand, Denmark

Nivå
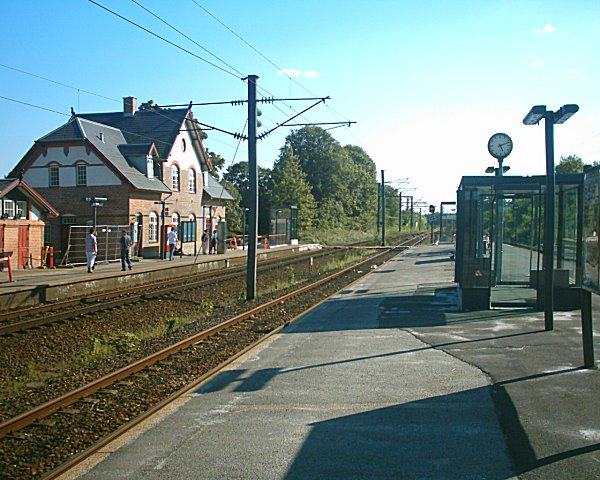
- The main station building

General information
- Location: Niverødvej 4; 2990 Nivå; Fredensborg Municipality; Denmark
- Coordinates: 55°56′01″N 12°30′23″E
- Elevation: 8.3 metres (27 ft)
- Owner: DSB (station infrastructure); Banedanmark (rail infrastructure)
- Line: Coast Line
- Platforms: 2
- Tracks: 3
- Train operators: DSB
- Connections: Bus line 354 and 388

History
- Opened: 2 August 1897

Services
Preceding station	DSB	Following station
Humlebæk towards Helsingør	Elsinore–Copenhagen– Roskilde–Holbæk Regional train	Kokkedal towards Holbæk
Humlebæk towards Helsingør	Elsinore–Copenhagen– Roskilde–Næstved Regional train	Kokkedal towards Næstved
Humlebæk towards Helsingør	Elsinore–Copenhagen– Køge–Næstved Regional train Peak hours	Kokkedal towards Næstved
Location

Nivå station is a railway station serving the suburb of Nivå on the coast of North Zealand north of central Copenhagen, Denmark, as well as the nearby Nivaagaard Art Gallery.

The station is located on the Coast Line between Helsingør and Copenhagen. The train services are currently operated by Danish State Railways (DSB) which runs a frequent regional rail service to Copenhagen Central Station.

The station was designed by Heinrich Wenck in the National Romantic style which characterize most of the stations along the line.

== Description ==
There is an underpass under the tracks at the southern end of the station and a bus stop on its west side.

== See also ==
- List of railway stations in Denmark
