= Biomesh =

Surgical mesh from biomaterial

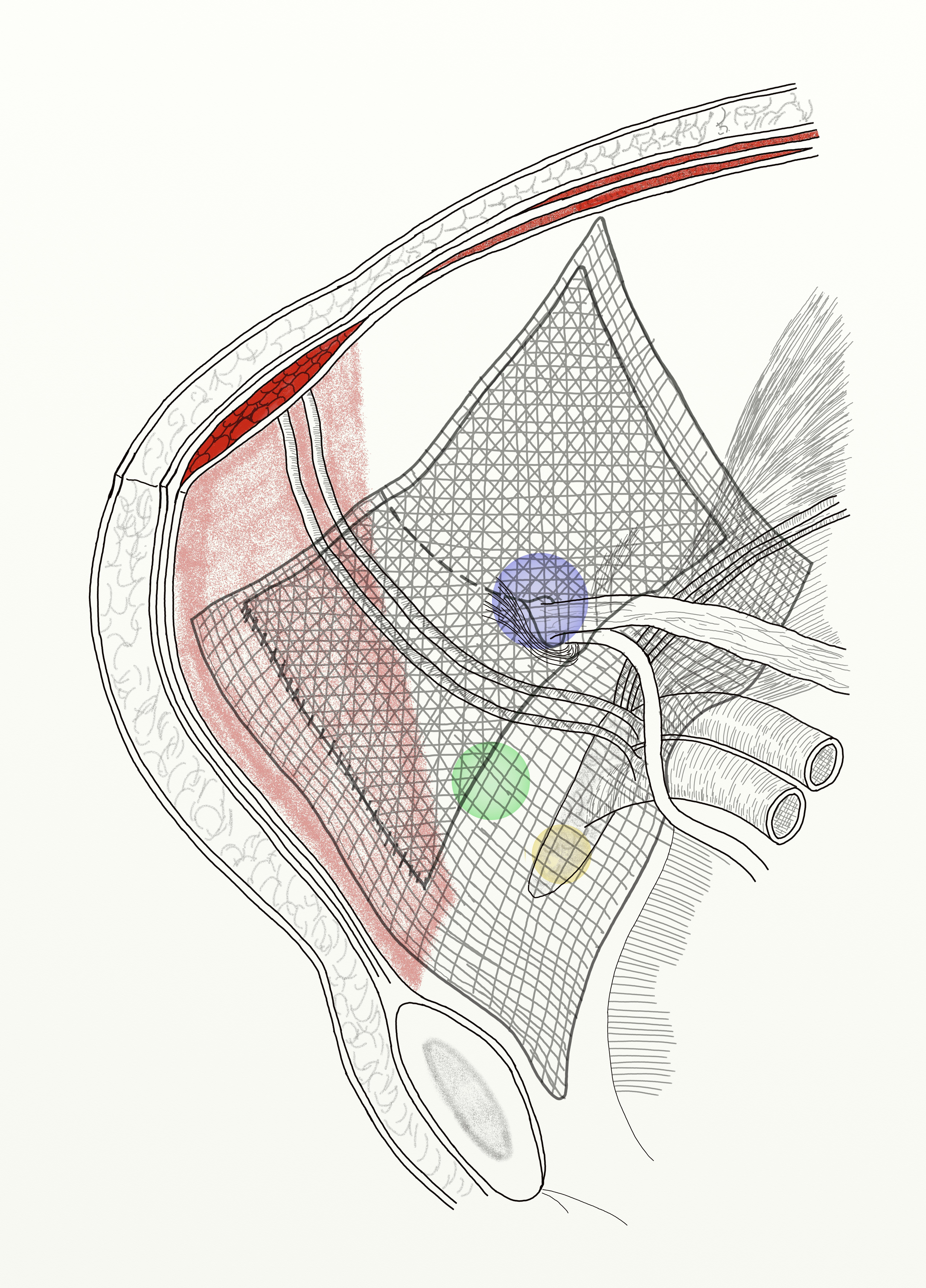
A biologic form of surgical mesh called biomesh has been used in inguinal and other types of hernia surgeries, particular in contaminated fields.

Biomesh (or biologic mesh) is a type of surgical mesh made from an organic biomaterial (such as porcine dermis, porcine small intestine submucosa, bovine dermis or pericardium, and the dermis or fascia lata of a cadaveric human). Biologic mesh is primarily indicated for several types of hernia repair, including inguinal and ventral hernias, hernia prophylaxis, and contaminated hernia repairs. However, it has also been used in pelvic floor dysfunction, parotidectomy, and reconstructive plastic surgery. The development of biologic mesh largely has derived from the need of a biocompatible material that addresses "the problems associated with a permanent synthetic mesh, including chronic inflammation, foreign body reaction, fibrosis, and mesh infection." As of 2015, however, the efficacy and optimal use of biological mesh products remains in question.

== Development, benefits, and drawbacks ==
The idea of using organic materials for surgical mesh has been around since at least the late 1950s, though researchers soon learned the materials they tested weren't biocompatible. Research into more compatible biomaterials occurred in the proceeding decades, including the search for cellular-based materials extracted from humans and animals. For example, in 1980, research presented at the first ever World Biomaterials Congress detailed the examined use of dermal collagen of sheep to construct biological mesh for reconstructive surgery. Since then, "research for developing and improvising the biological material required for the production of these meshes" has been ongoing.

Typical advantages attributed to biologic meshes include a reduced risk of infection compared to synthetic meshes, and the absorption of the mesh into the resulting scar as part of cellular ingrowth. Commonly described drawbacks include the high cost of the material and its uncertain clinical effectiveness, particularly when the high cost is considered. An August 2015 literature review published by the Canadian Agency for Drugs and Technologies in Health addressed these drawbacks, concluding that "there remains a lack of sufficient evidence to guide clinical practice regarding the use of biological mesh products... Further rigorously designed RCTs are required to clarify comparative clinical effectiveness and safety of the many available biological mesh products for most surgical indications in which their use has been suggested."

=== Contamination considerations ===
The presence of contamination may limit the applicability of permanent synthetic mesh in some procedures such as hernia repair. Biologic mesh may be acceptable for this purpose or for placement in open wounds as a staged closure in complex abdominal wall reconstruction. There is limited data in both of these areas, with some noting a high risk of hernia recurrence and associated infection. The data is mostly limited to animal models and case series. However, the lack of suitable alternatives has made biologic mesh attractive for contaminated field hernia repair.
