= Humlebæk railway station =

Railway station in Denmark

Humlebæk
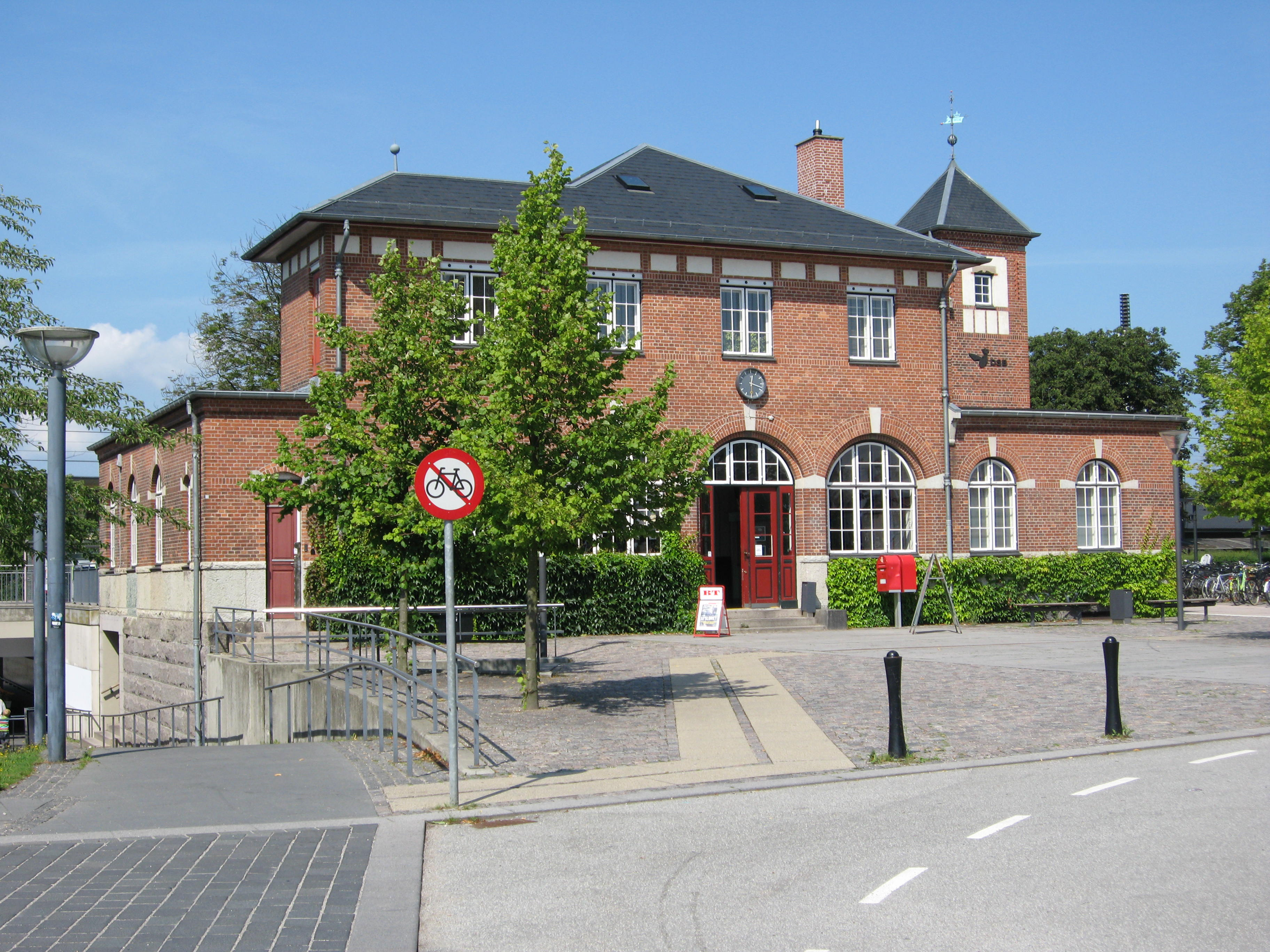
- Front facade of Humlebæk Station

General information
- Location: Hal Kochs Vej 14; 3050 Humlebæk; Fredensborg Municipality; Denmark
- Coordinates: 55°57′50″N 12°31′59″E
- Elevation: 16.5 metres (54 ft)
- System: railway station
- Owner: DSB (station infrastructure); Banedanmark (rail infrastructure)
- Line: Coast Line
- Train operators: DSB

History
- Opened: 2 August 1897

Services
Preceding station	DSB	Following station
Espergærde towards Helsingør	Elsinore–Copenhagen– Roskilde–Holbæk Regional train	Nivå towards Holbæk
Espergærde towards Helsingør	Elsinore–Copenhagen– Roskilde–Næstved Regional train	Nivå towards Næstved
Espergærde towards Helsingør	Elsinore–Copenhagen– Køge–Næstved Regional train Peak hours	Nivå towards Næstved
Location
- Location within Denmark Location within Capital Region

Humlebæk Station is a railway station serving the suburb of Humlebæk in North Zealand, Denmark, c. 35 km north of central Copenhagen, as well as the nearby Louisiana Museum of Modern Art.

The station is located on the Coast Line between Helsingør and Copenhagen and opened in 1897. The train services are operated by the railway company DSB, which runs a frequent regional rail service between Helsingør and Copenhagen Central Station.

The station building from 1897 is designed by Heinrich Wenck. It is on the east side of the tracks. The shopping mall Humlebæk Center is on the west side.

== See also ==
- List of railway stations in Denmark
