= Kerecis =

Icelandic medical technology company

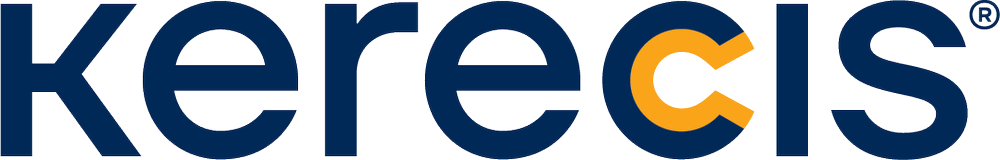
- Type: Subsidiary
- Industry: Medical devices Biotechnology
- Founded: 2009; 17 years ago in Ísafjörður, Iceland
- Founder: Gudmundur Fertram Sigurjonsson
- Headquarters: Ísafjörður, Iceland
- Area served: Worldwide
- Key people: Fertram Sigurjonsson (CEO)
- Products: Omega3 Wound; MariGen; GraftGuide; SurgiBind/SurgiClose; Shield; Kerecis VET
- Revenue: 25,492,874 euro (2021)
- Number of employees: 630 (2025)
- Parent: Coloplast
- Subsidiaries: Kerecis AG
- Website: kerecis.com

Kerecis is an Icelandic company that develops wound care and tissue regeneration products derived from the decellularized skin of the Atlantic cod. The company is headquartered in Ísafjörður, in the Westfjords of northwest Iceland, and has subsidiaries in Switzerland and the United States.

== History ==
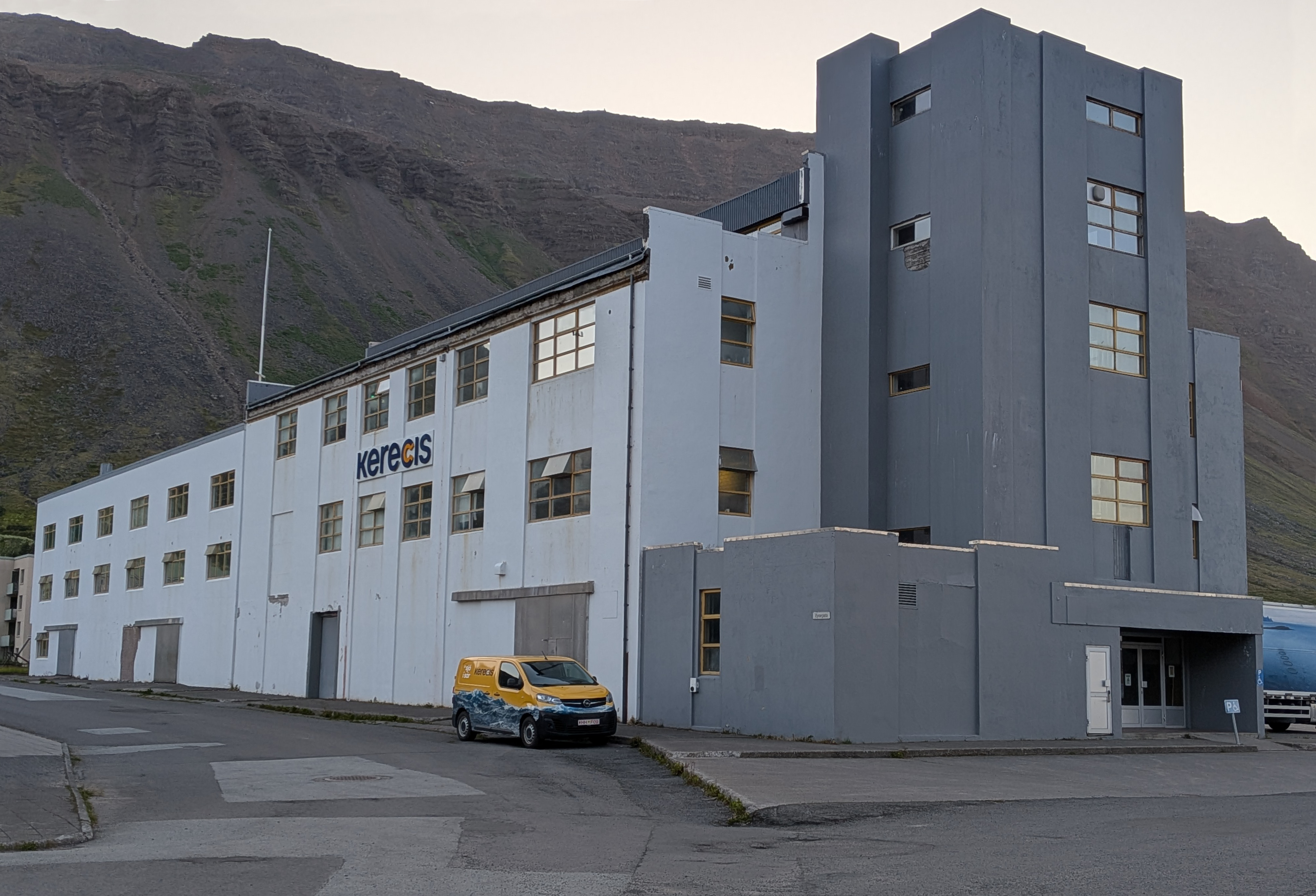
Kerecis factory

Kerecis was founded by chemist Gudmundur Fertram Sigurjonsson, who began entrepreneurial projects in the medical device field in 2007 after returning to Iceland. Drawing on his prior experience in human-tissue repair and his youth in the fishing village of Ísafjörður, Sigurjonsson developed the concept of using fish skin to heal damaged human tissue. He observed in 2009 that the skin of the fish and qualities, which are similar to those of human skin, expedited the latter's regeneration, particularly in the case of acute or chronic wounds. Based on his discovery, he founded Kereceis in 2013.

In 2012, Kerecis Omega3 Wound received its first CE mark in Europe. In November 2013, Kerecis received 510(k) clearance from the U.S. Food and Drug Administration (FDA) to sell MariGen Omega3, a decellularized intact fish-skin product, for the treatment of chronic wounds, including diabetic, vascular, and other hard-to-heal wounds.

In 2015, Kerecis received a grant from the United States Department of Defense to adapt its products for burn and blast injuries, and the company transferred its sales and marketing head office to the Washington, D.C. area. In September 2016, the FDA cleared Kerecis Omega3 SecureMesh, a regenerative surgical mesh developed in collaboration with the Office of Naval Research, for use in lung, bariatric, gastric, colorectal, and other surgeries. In the same year, Kerecis established headquarters in Arlington, Virginia.

In February 2019, Kerecis acquired the Swiss life science company Phytoceuticals AG, subsequently renamed it as Kerecis AG. In April 2019, Kerecis closed a US$16 million Series C equity financing, with Laurene Powell Jobs' Emerson Collective among the investors, and later expanded the round to a US$21 million total with additional capital from Silicon Valley Bank and existing investors..

In 2020, Kerecis received an award given by Vaxtarsprotinn, a joint project of the Confederation of Icelandic Industries, the Confederation of Start-up Companies, Icelandic Research Center, and Reykjavík University.

In October 2021, the FDA cleared Kerecis Omega3 SurgiBind, an implantable fish-skin graft for plastic and reconstructive surgery. In July 2022, Kerecis completed a US$100 million Series D financing led by Kirkbi, the family holding company of the Kirk Kristiansen family that owns The Lego Group, valuing the company at US$620 million.

In July 2023, Coloplast announced an agreement to acquire Kerecis for up to US$1.3 billion, consisting of an upfront cash payment of US$1.2 billion and an earnout potential of up to US$100 million. The acquisition was completed on August 31, 2023, making Kerecis Iceland's first unicorn company.

In December 2024, Kerecis transferred its intellectual property rights to Coloplast in a transaction generating an estimated 40 billion ISK (US$285 million) in tax payments to the Icelandic treasury, payable over a seven-year period.

In 2025, a bald eagle in Wisconsin named "Kere" was rehabilitated using Kerecis veterinary fish-skin grafts in the first documented use of the technology on the species.

== Operations ==
Kerecis develops, manufactures, and distributes intact fish-skin medical devices that support soft tissue regeneration in the body, with U.S. federal and European regulatory clearance. The technology uses the decellularized skin of Atlantic cod caught in the North Atlantic off Iceland's northwest coast, which is processed in Ísafjörður using renewable energy.

Kerecis is a member of the Iceland Ocean Cluster and a participant in the cluster's 100% Fish Project, which seeks to develop high-value products from byproducts of the country's cod fishery. The company conducts medical research with the United States Armed Forces and supplies grafts to branches of the U.S. military for the treatment of burn and blast wounds.
