= Mette Thomsen =

Danish novelist

Mette Thomsen (born 26 February 1970) is a Danish novelist.

According to Thomsen, she belongs to the culture of "zappers" who have grown up with computers, mobile phones and television, leading to a more limited experience of the world and fewer relationships with other people. This leads to a feeling of anxiety, the starting point of her novels.

== Biography ==
Born in Humlebæk in Northeastern Zealand in Denmark, Thomsen developed her interest in storytelling while at Zahles Gymnasieskole, the high school she completed in 1989. In 1991, she spent the summer months at the London Cartoon Centre learning how to write cartoon strips. Thomsen then spent a couple of years studying law in Copenhagen, but then returned creating cartoons.

The influence of cartoons can be seen in Thomsen's first humorous novel Af en superhelts bekendelser (Confessions of a Superhero, 1994). After becoming an attempted rape victim, the heroine becomes a superhero who suppresses violent men.

Thomsen's next novel Plastic (1995) is about a girl receiving unemployment benefits who dreams of becoming a successful Barbie doll in a perfect life to come. In 2005, Thomsen published the poetry collection Vindæg.

Thomsen's 2009 novel Seks is about six people. It is based on the theory that everyone on earth can come into contact with everyone else via relationships with six other people. All the individuals nevertheless experience a sense of loneliness.
