= Niels Peter Louis-Hansen =

Danish billionaire businessman (born 1947)

- Born: 25 October 1947 (age 78); Humlebaek, Denmark
- Occupation: Businessman
- Title: Deputy chairman, Coloplast
- Spouse: Married
- Children: 1 daughter
- Parent(s): Aage Louis-Hansen; Johanne Louis-Hansen

Niels Peter Louis-Hansen (born 25 October 1947) is a Danish billionaire businessman, deputy chairman and owner of one-fifth of the medical device company Coloplast.

== Early life ==
Niels Peter Louis-Hansen was born in Denmark, the son of Aage Louis-Hansen and Johanne Louis-Hansen. Coloplast was founded by his father in 1957, who took it public in 1983. Louis-Hansen has a bachelor's degree.

== Career ==
Louis-Hansen became a board member of Coloplast when his father died in 1966, and the company was continued by his mother. His mother was active in the company until the early 1970s.

Louis-Hansen owns 20.7% of Coloplast directly, making him the company's largest shareholder. He also owns 15.6% of Ambu, and via the investment company N.P. Louis-Hansen ApS, is a major shareholder in the unlisted biotech company Virogates.

Bloomberg News estimated his net worth at US$7 billion in 2018.

== Personal life ==
Louis-Hansen is married, with one daughter, and lives in Humlebaek. He is also the owner of Tustrup Manor at Randers.
