= Espergærde railway station =

Railway station in North Zealand, Denmark

Espergærde
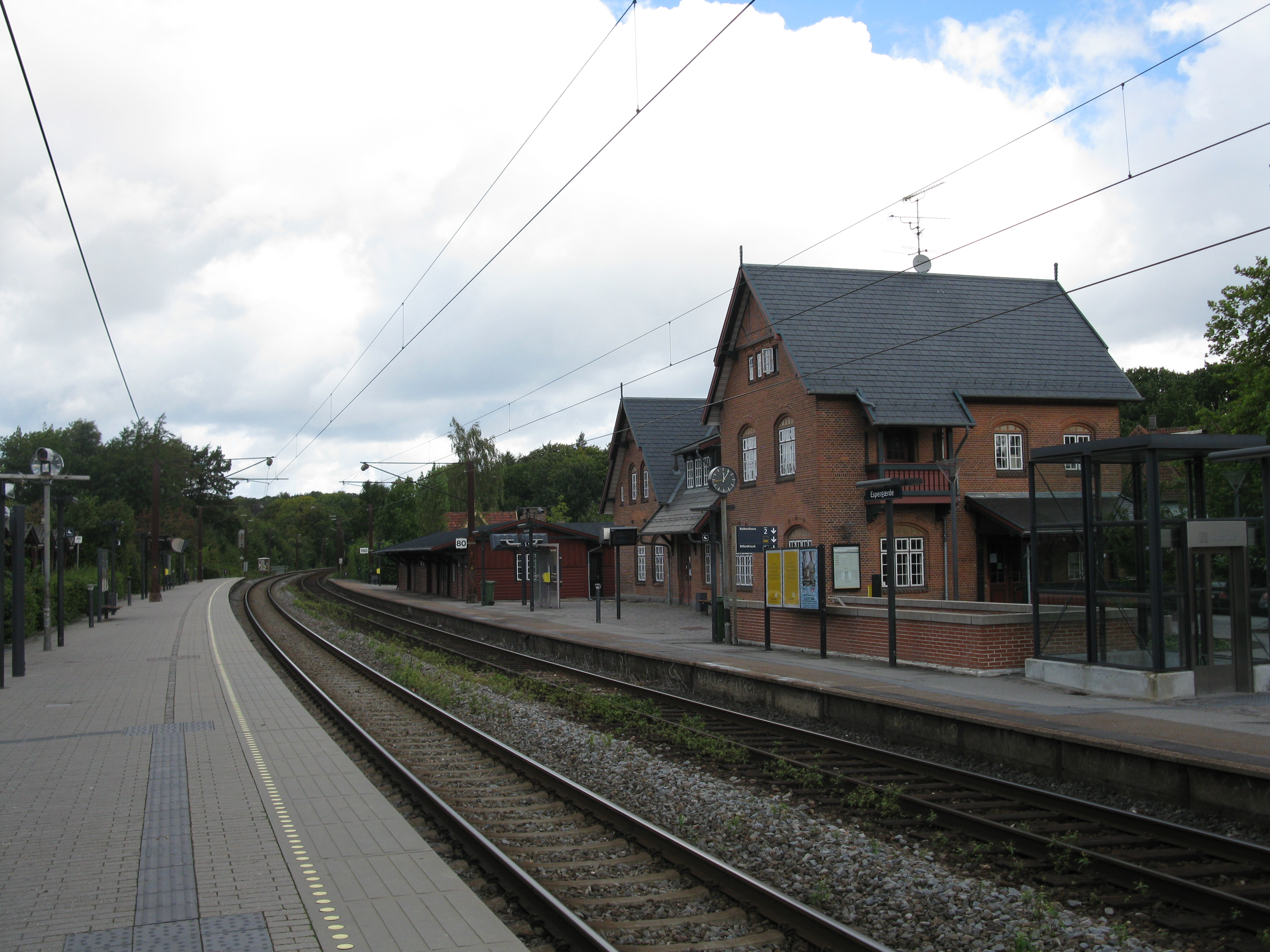
- Espergærde station in 2010

General information
- Location: Kløvermarken 3; 3060 Espergærde; Helsingør Municipality; Denmark
- Coordinates: 55°59′45″N 12°32′59″E
- Elevation: 17.7 metres (58 ft)
- Owner: DSB (station infrastructure); Banedanmark (rail infrastructure)
- Line: Coast Line
- Train operators: DSB

History
- Opened: May 1898

Services
| Preceding station | DSB | Following station |
|---|---|---|
| Snekkersten towards Helsingør | Elsinore–Copenhagen– Roskilde–Holbæk Regional train | Humlebæk towards Holbæk |
| Snekkersten towards Helsingør | Elsinore–Copenhagen– Roskilde–Næstved Regional train | Humlebæk towards Næstved |
| Helsingør Terminus | Elsinore–Copenhagen– Køge–Næstved Regional train Peak hours | Humlebæk towards Næstved |
Location

Espergærde station is a railway station serving the satellite town of Espergærde in North Zealand, Denmark, circa 40 km north of central Copenhagen.

The station is located on the Coast Line between Helsingør and Copenhagen. The train services are currently operated by Danish State Railways. Espergærde is a quiet residential neighbourhood and the station sees mostly local traffic.

== History ==
Espergærde station was not one of the original stations on the Coast Line which opened in August 1897. DSB estimated that the customer base was too small for a station. However, shortly the opening of the railway line, a local initiative managed to strike a deal with the Ministry of Interior Affairs and DSB which provided the necessary funding for a station, resulting in the opening of the station in May 1898.

== Buildings ==
The red timber structure on the east side of the tracks is the original station building. The brick building next to it was constructed in 1904–05.

A new station building with ticket office and a kiosk on the west side of the tracks was inaugurated in November 1997. This building is now a pizza establishment.

== See also ==
- List of railway stations in Denmark
- Rail transport in Denmark
