= Humlebæk =

- Town
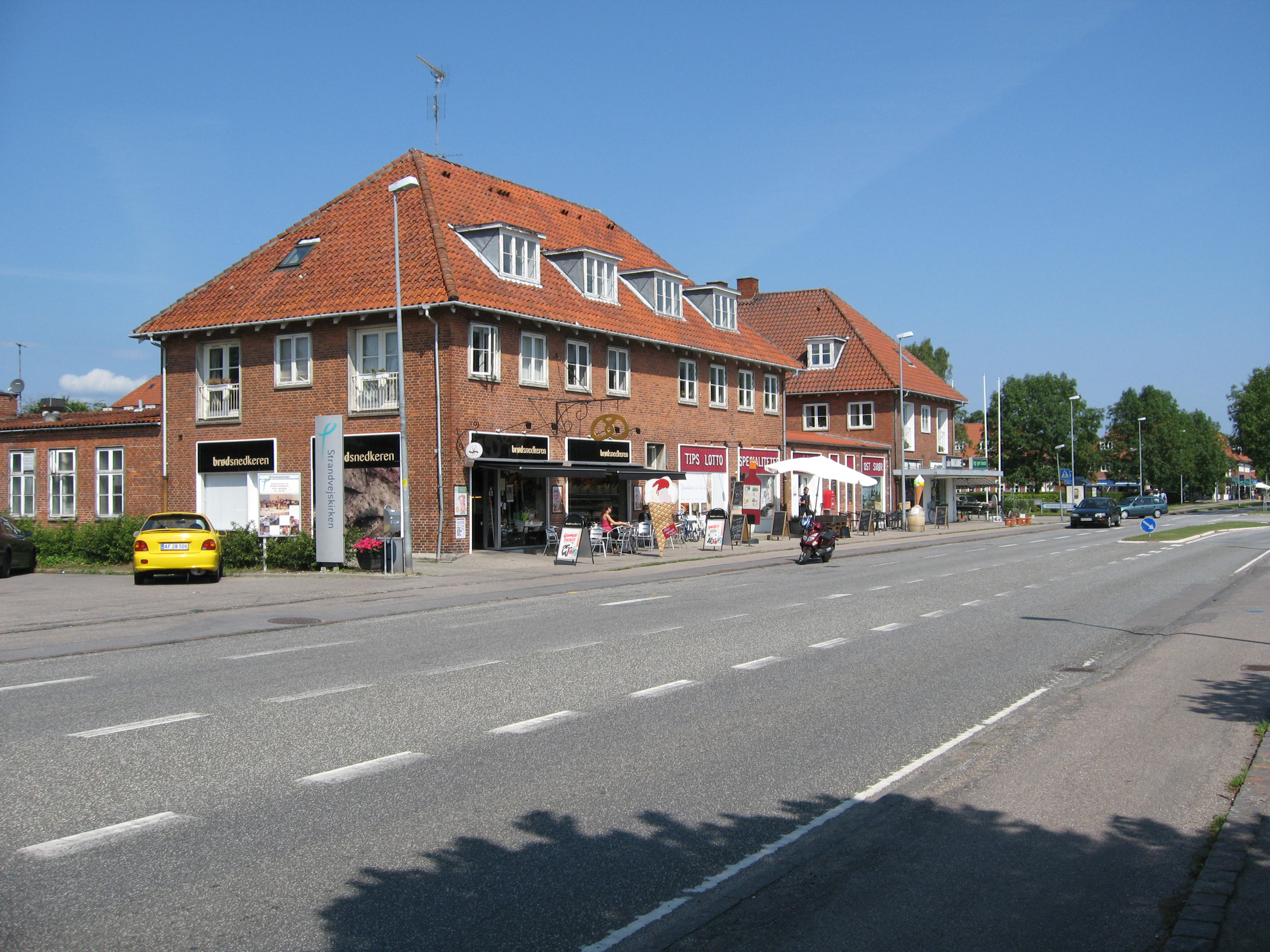
- Shops on Strandvejen

- Location in Denmark Humlebæk (Capital Region)
- Coordinates: 55°57′40″N 12°31′30″E
- Country: Denmark
- Region: Capital Region of Denmark
- Municipality: Fredensborg Municipality

Area
  - Urban: 4.2 km^{2} (1.6 sq mi)

Population (1 January 2026)
  - Urban: 9,802
  - Urban density: 2,300/km^{2} (6,000/sq mi)
  - Gender: 4,735 males and 5,067 females
- Time zone: UTC+1 (CET)
  - Summer (DST): UTC+2 (CEST)
- Postal code: DK-3050 Humlebæk

Humlebæk is a town within the municipality of Fredensborg in North Zealand in Denmark, approximately 35 km north of Copenhagen. Humlebæk is located at the shore to Øresund and has a population of 9,802 (2026).

The Louisiana Museum of Modern Art is located in Humlebæk.

== History ==
The history of Humlebæk traces back to the 16th century where the urbarium for Kronborg and Frederiksborg fief mentions a fishing village in 1582–1583 with seven fishermen in the settlement.

On 24 July 1700 (O.S.) Swedish forces invaded Denmark at the landing at Humlebæk during the Great Northern War.

In 1740 the inn Humlebæk Kro received royal privilege and in 1792 a school was established.

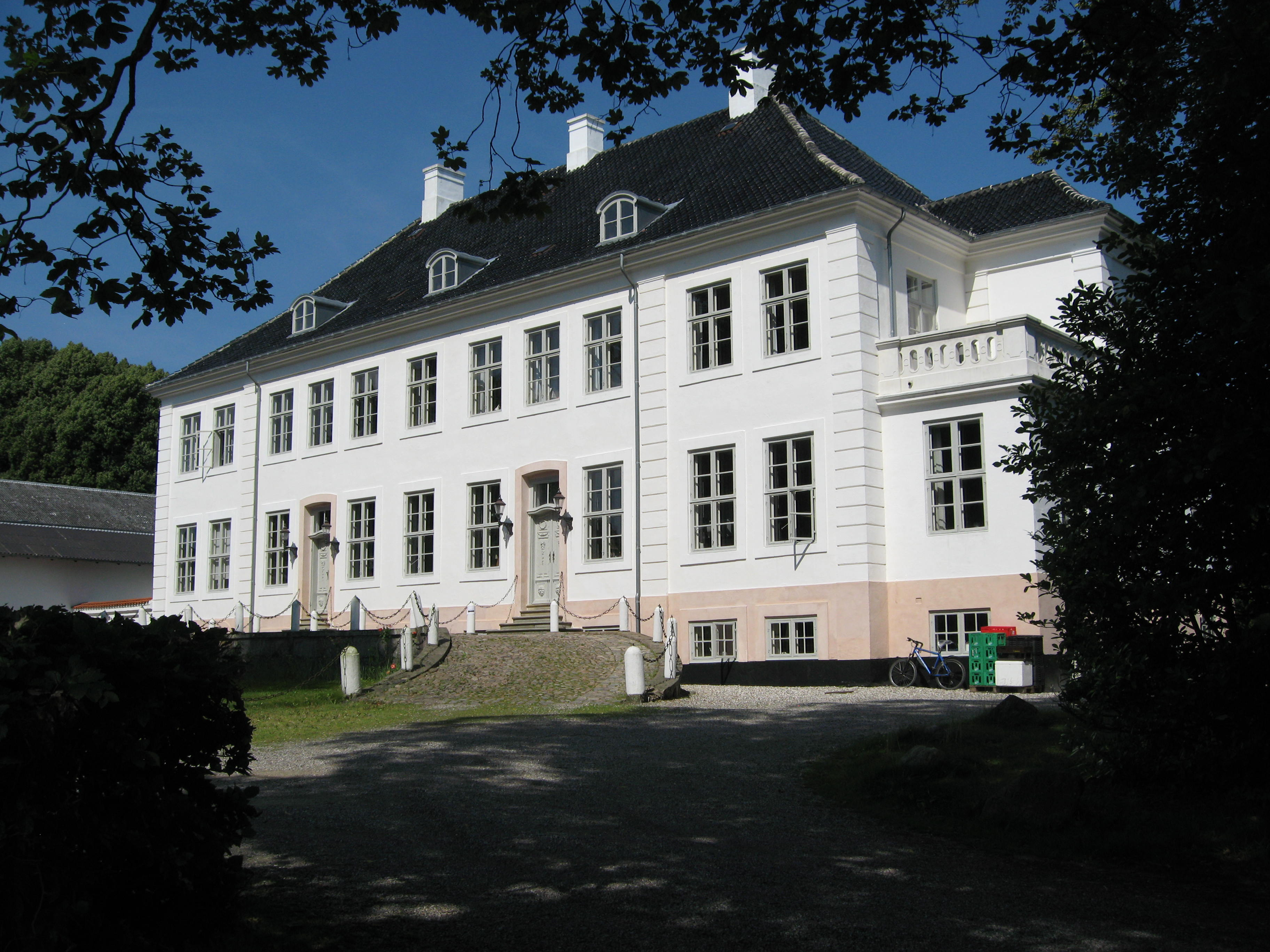
Krogerup

The dominating property was Krogerup. Krogerup was originally a farm house mentioned the first time in 1577 but over time the property was expanded because of privileges given to the owners of Krogerup as rewards for loyalty to the King during the wars against Sweden. A manor house was built at Krogerup from 1772 to 1777. Krogerup was acquired by the Danish government in 1942 and the land distributed as part of land reforms.

During the Battle of Copenhagen in 1807 the construction of a fortified harbour in Humlebæk was initiated. The harbour was intended to be base of privateer warships and gunboats. The fortified harbour was never finished as the war against the British ended before the finalisation of the constructions. A few years later, in 1810, Humlebæk Harbour was established.

During the second half of the 19th century Humlebæk became a popular resort for the population of Copenhagen during summertime. The Danish steamship company Det Forenede Dampskibs-Selskab (The United Steamship Company) opened a ferry line with steamboats sailing up along the coast of Øresund from Copenhagen with a stop in Humlebæk.

In 1897, the railway line the "Coast Line" from Copenhagen to Helsingør was opened. The railway line had a stop in the newly established Humlebæk railway station. The opening resulted in a major boost of Humlebæk and its surroundings. The train station was placed a bit outside the old village of Humlebæk, the fishing village Sletten and the nearby village Toelt. Over time the different settlements grew together. A new settlement grew from the train station to the coast (New Humlebæk, south of the Old Humlebæk next to Humlebæk Harbour). Until 1950 the three areas Humlebæk (New Humlebæk and the Old Humlebæk at the coast), Sletten and Torpen were considered separate settlements.

The development of the population of the three settlements appears from below

Settlement	1906	1911	1916	1921	1925	1930	1935	1940	1945	1950	1955	1960	1965
Humlebæk	140	312	348	362	477	483	602	568	744	-	-	-	-
Sletten	-	480	508	596	463	467	469	546	556	-	-	-	-
Torpen	-	-	-	-	297	256	341	286	331	-	-	-	-
I alt	(140)	(792)	(856)	(958)	(1.237)	(1.206)	(1.412)	(1.400)	(1.631)	2.073	2.619	3.371	4.054

The old villages Dageløkke, Torpen (Upper Torp and Lower Torp), Toelt, Nybo are today considered part of Humlebæk.

== Infrastructure and transport ==
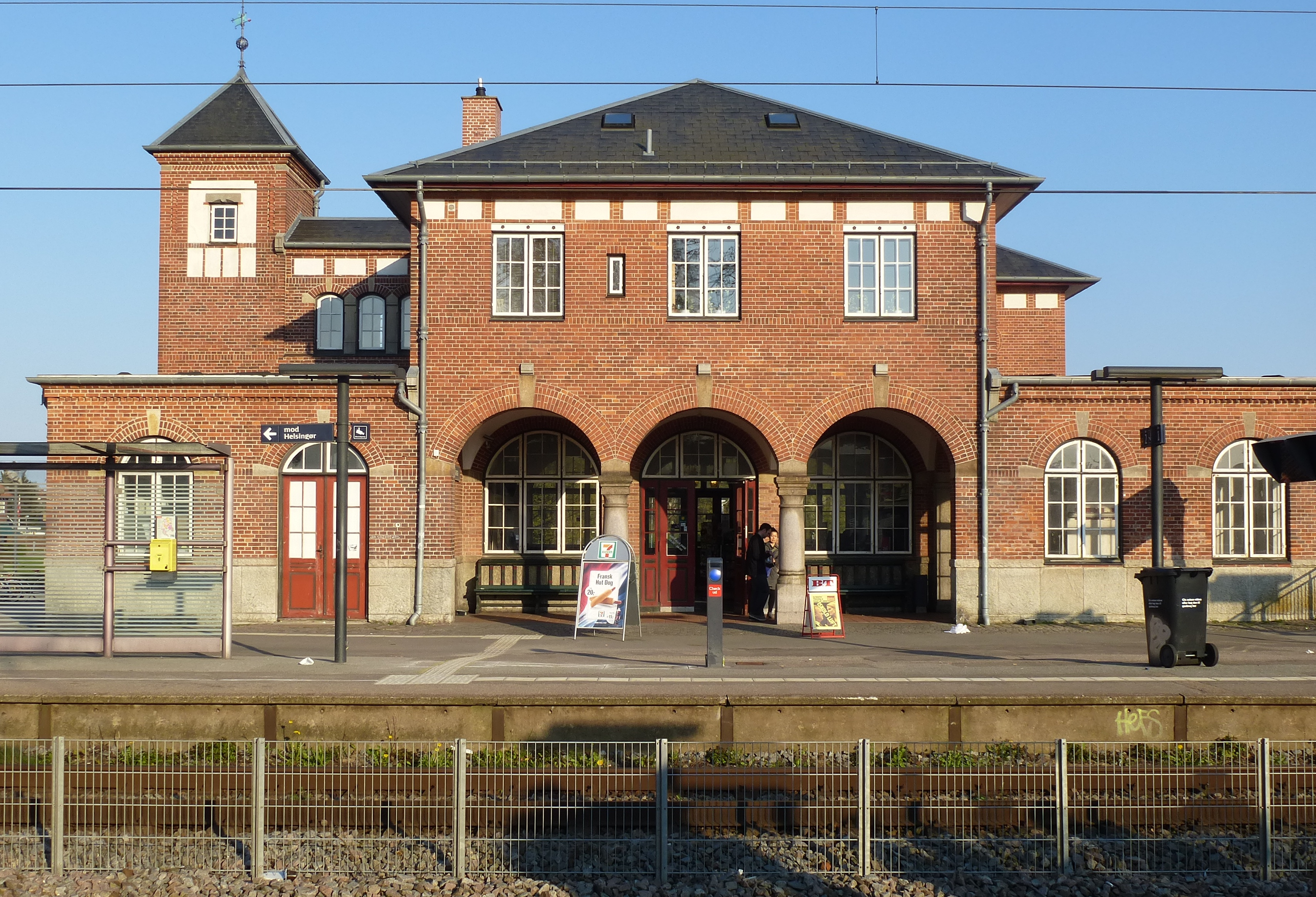
Humlebæk station

=== Trains and buses ===
Humlebæk has train connections to Copenhagen and Helsingør by Humlebæk Station at The Coast Line. Trains depart every 20 minutes in each direction. In rush hours trains are more frequent. The trains are part of the Øresundståg-system and the trains for Copenhagen continues to Copenhagen Airport and to Sweden.

Bus no. 388 in a north–south route between Helsingør and Lyngby station has several stops in Humlebæk at road no. 152 (Strandvejen). Bus no. 353 runs north–south further inland between Helsingør and Kokkedal station. It passes the western part of Humlebæk on Hørsholmvej. Bus no. 370 in an east–west route connects Humlebæk with Fredensborg.

=== Harbours ===
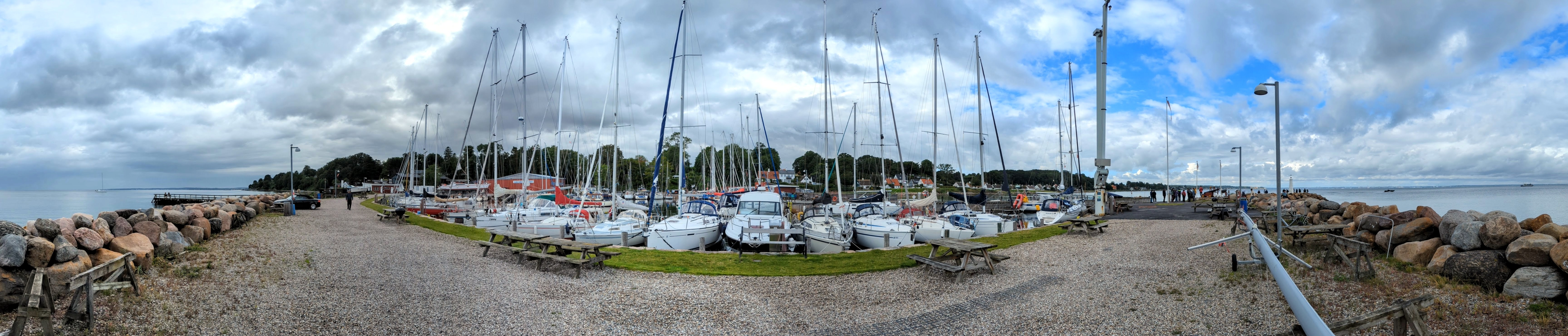
Panoramic view of Humlebæk Havn, the small craft harbour by the Louisiana Museum of Modern Art

At the coast to Øresund, Humlebæk has two harbours, Humlebæk Harbour and Sletten Harbour. The harbours are primarily marinas but a few minor fishing boats are based in the harbours. Sletten Harbour has previously had ferry connections to Helsingborg in Sweden and to the island Ven in the middle of Øresund.

== Culture and education ==
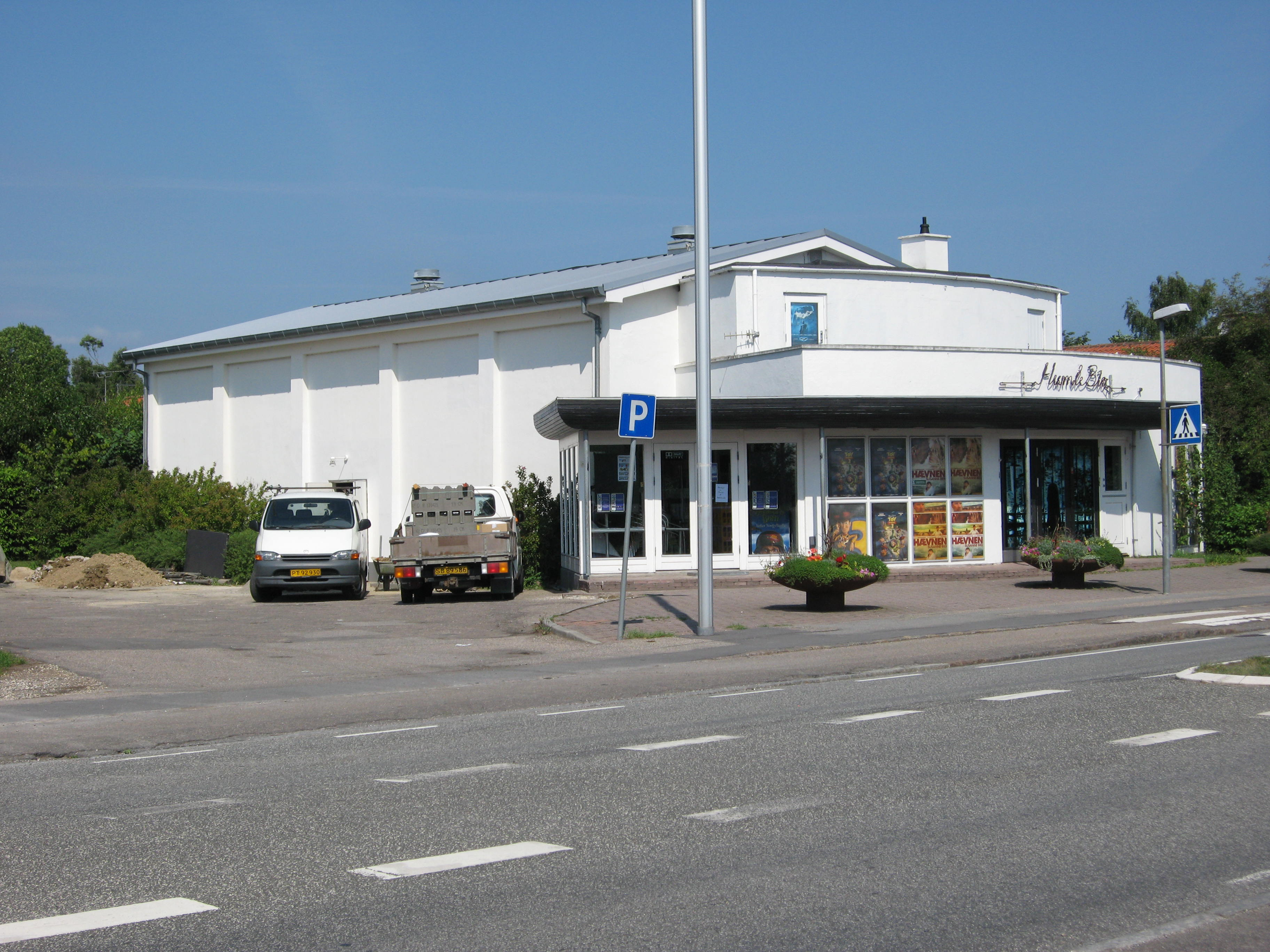
The cinema Humle Bio

In 1938 a cinema Humle Bio opened in Humlebæk. The cinema is still active and was renovated in 2023 with new chairs.

Humlebæk is home of Louisiana Museum of Modern Art. The museum opened in 1958 and has today approximately 600,000 yearly visitors. In 2018 Louisiana was number 7 on the list of most visited tourist attractions in Denmark.

Humlebæk has three primary schools, Langebjergskolen, Humlebæk Skole, and Humlebæk Lille Skole. A fourth school Baunebjergskolen was merged with Humlebæk Skole in 2011 but still uses the old buildings. A folk high school, Krogerup Højskole, is today located at Krogerup.

== Economy ==
The shopping mall Humlebæk Center opened just west of the station in 1977. There are also shops on Strandvejen a little east of the station. The multinational health care company Coloplast has its headquarters in west Humlebæk. Many small companies are located in the nearby industrial quarter on Bakkegårdsvej.

== Notable people ==
- Ole Kielberg (1911 in Humlebæk – 1985) a Danish painter who joined the Odsherred Painters
- Carl Nielsen (1865–1931) wrote the first movement of his Symphony No. 5 in Humlebæk in the winter and spring of 1921
- Niels Peter Louis-Hansen (born 1947) a Danish billionaire businessman, lives in Humlebæk
- Poul Erik Tøjner (born 1959) director of the Louisiana Museum of Modern Art in Humlebæk
- Mette Thomsen (born 1970 in Humlebæk) a Danish novelist, belonging to the culture of "zappers"
