= Incisional hernia =

Surgical condition

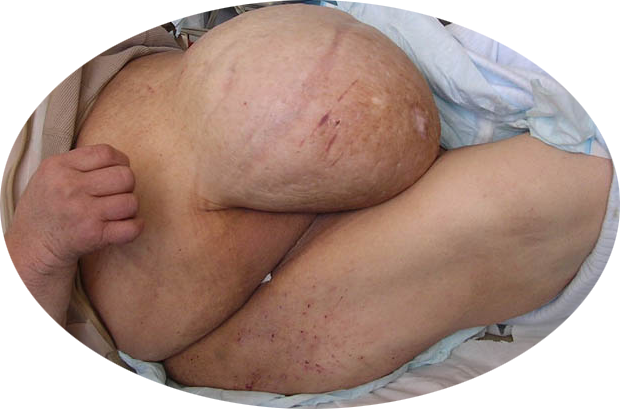
- Voluminous incisional hernia
- Specialty: General surgery

An incisional hernia is a type of hernia caused by an incompletely-healed surgical wound. Since median incisions in the abdomen are frequent for abdominal exploratory surgery, ventral incisional hernias are often also classified as ventral hernias due to their location. Not all ventral hernias are from incisions, as some may be caused by other trauma or congenital problems.

== Signs and symptoms ==
Clinically, incisional hernias present as a bulge or protrusion at or near the area of a surgical incision. Virtually any prior abdominal operation can develop an incisional hernia at the scar area (provided adequate healing does not occur due to infection), including large abdominal procedures such as intestinal or vascular surgery, and small incisions, such as appendix removal or abdominal exploratory surgery. While incisional hernias can occur at any incision, they tend to occur more commonly along a straight line from the xiphoid process of the sternum straight down to the pubis, and are more complex in these regions. Hernias in these areas have a high rate of recurrence if repaired via a simple suture technique under tension. For this reason, it is especially advised that these be repaired via a tension free repair method using a synthetic mesh.

== Cause ==
Incisional hernias are usually caused by a weakness of the surgical wounds, which may be caused by hematoma, seroma, or infection, all of which result in decreased wound healing. They may also be caused by increased intra-abdominal pressure due to a chronic cough (as in COPD), constipation, urinary obstruction (as in BPH), pregnancy, or ascites. They can also result from poor surgical technique.

== Treatment ==
Traditional "open" repair of incisional hernias can be quite difficult and complicated. The weakened tissue of the abdominal wall is re-incised and a repair is reinforced using a prosthetic mesh. Complications, particularly infection of the incision, frequently occur because of the large size of the incision required to perform this surgery. A mesh infection after this type of hernia repair most frequently requires a complete removal of the mesh and ultimately results in surgical failure. In addition, large incisions required for open repair are commonly associated with significant postoperative pain. Reported recurrence rates after open repair are up to 20% and influenced by mesh size and fixation type.

Regeneration by autologous tissue stem cells is a unique method for repair of large incisional hernias. It not only obviates causative factors responsible for herniation but utilises these factors to strengthen repair and regeneration of traumatised tissues.

Laparoscopic incisional hernia repair is a new method of surgery for this condition. The operation is performed using surgical microscopes and specialized instruments. The surgical mesh is placed into the abdomen underneath the abdominal muscles through small incisions to the side of the hernia. In this manner, the weakened tissue of the original hernia is never re-incised to perform the repair, and one can minimize the potential for wound complications such as infections. In addition, performance of the operation through smaller incisions can make the operation less painful and speed recovery. Laparoscopic repair has been demonstrated to be safe and a more resilient repair than open incisional hernia repair.

It is uncertain whether wound drains insertion after incisional hernia repair is associated with better outcomes.
