= Surgical mesh =

Material used in surgery

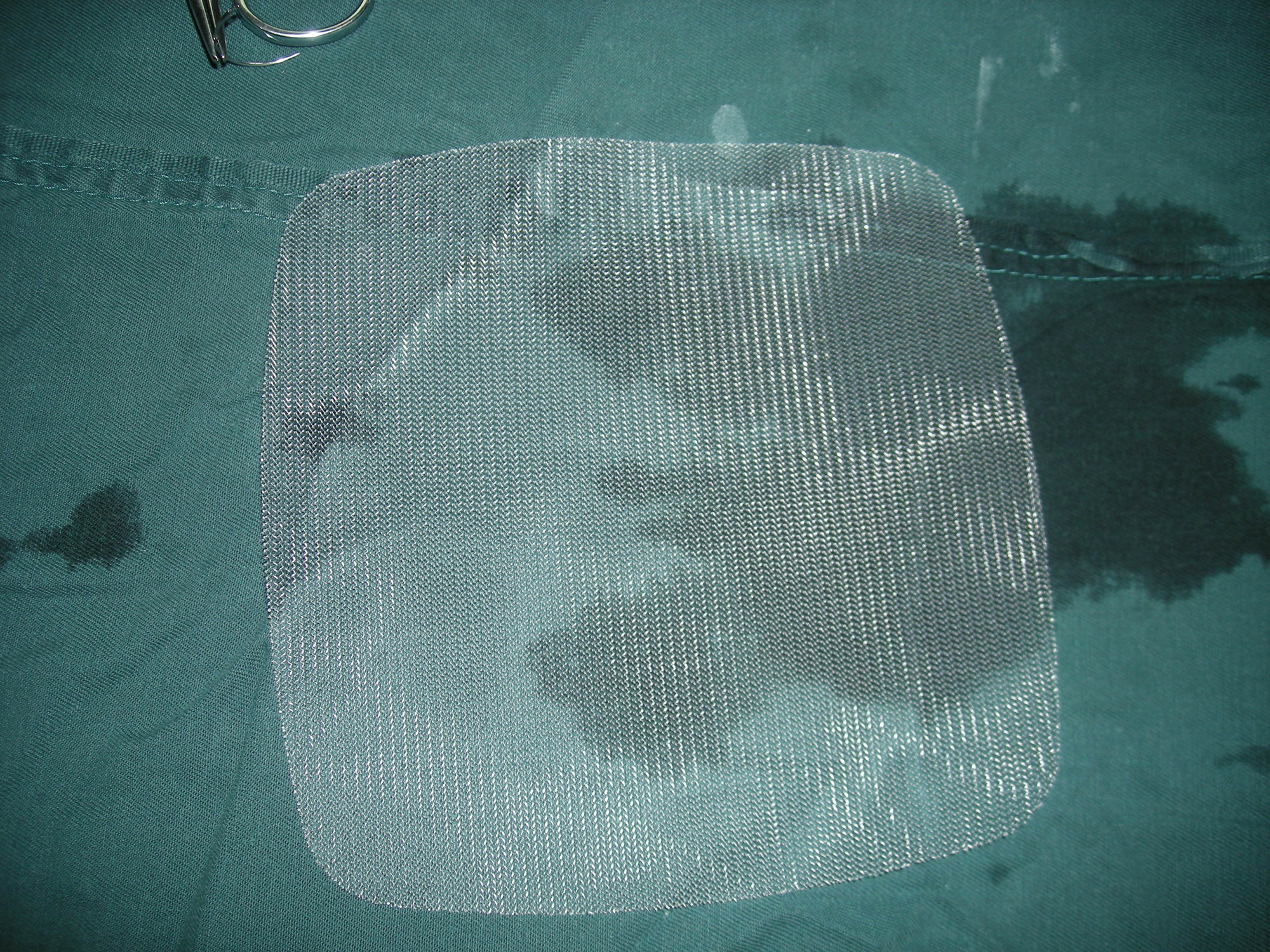
Surgical mesh made of polypropylene, used for inguinal hernia

Surgical mesh (also called hernia mash) is a medical implant made of loosely woven mesh, which is used in surgery as either a permanent or temporary structural support for organs and other tissues. Surgical mesh can be made from both inorganic and biological materials and is used in a variety of surgeries, although hernia repair is the most common application. It can also be used for reconstructive work, such as in pelvic organ prolapse or to repair physical defects (mainly of body cavity walls) created by extensive resections or traumatic tissue loss.

Permanent meshes remain in the body, whereas temporary ones dissolve over time. One temporary mesh was shown in 2012 to fully dissolve after three years in a scientific trial on sheep. Some types of mesh combine permanent and temporary meshes which includes both resorbable vicryl, made from polyglycolic acid, and prolene, a non-resorbable polypropylene.

Data of mechanical and biological behaviors of mesh in vivo may not always be reflective of conditions within the human body due to testing in non-human organisms. Most published reports experiment on mice, thus creating the likelihood of possible differences when inserted into the human body. Also, most published research reports reference meshes that are currently disallowed from the medical device market due to complications post-surgery. Additionally, the absence of FDA-approved regulatory protocols and universal standard operating procedures leads to a variety of different testing methods from researcher to researcher. Experimentation may find differing outcomes for some meshes.

== Medical uses ==
The primary function of surgical mesh is to support prolapsed organs either temporarily or permanently. It is most commonly used in hernia surgery within the abdomen, which is required when an organ protrudes through abdominal muscles. Surgical mesh may also be used for pelvic or vaginal wall reconstructions in women and is implemented to add as a growth guide for damaged tissue. Ideally, these implants should be strong enough to survive mechanical loads and actions of whichever body area they become a part of.

=== Hernia surgery ===
Hernia surgery is one of the most common current applications of surgical mesh, in which case it is often called a hernia mesh. Hernias occur when organs or fatty tissue bulge through openings or debilitated areas of muscle, usually in the abdominal wall. Surgical mesh is implanted to strengthen tissue repair and minimize the rate of recurrence. The surgery can be performed laparoscopically (internally) or open with a variety of materials available for prosthesis. Polypropylene (PP) is the most frequently used type of mesh, although it may be uncomfortable for the patient after implantation. Another type that is less utilized in hernia surgery is polyethylene terephthalate (PET), which faces complications because it easily degrades after some years of implantation, erasing the effects of the surgery. Polytetrafluoroethylene (PTFE) is used as well, but is manufactured in the form of a foil and has difficulty integrating into surrounding tissue, therefore it loses stability.

In hernia surgery, an implanted mesh may be fixated to the surrounding tissue to prevent it from migrating. This may be performed using a variety of different materials, which include sutures, tacks, tissue adhesives, self-fixating meshes, or a combination of these. Specifically in incisional hernia surgery, there is not sufficient evidence to suggest that any of these should be superior to the others.

=== Pelvic surgery ===
Similar to hernia surgery, synthetic meshes may be used for organ prolapses in the pelvic region as well. Pelvic organ prolapse occurs in 50% of women above the age of 50 with a history of one or more vaginal childbirths throughout her lifetime. Mesh surgery can be performed in various areas of the pelvic region, such as cystocele, rectocele, and vaginal vault or uterus. The most commonly used material, as in hernia surgery, is PP, which is considered to have acceptable biocompatibility within the region. It induces a mild inflammatory response but has a tendency to adhere to the viscera.

The vaginal wall has three layers: tunica mucosa, muscularis, adventitia. When prolapse occurs, smooth fibers of the muscularis are compromised. Prolapse in women has also been seen to increase stiffness in the pelvis, particularly post-menopausal women. Surgical mesh that is used in pelvic reconstruction must counter this stiffness, but if the modulus of elasticity is too high, it will not sufficiently support the organs. On the contrary, if the mesh is too stiff, tissue will erode and inflammatory responses will cause post-surgical complications. Post-implantation, polypropylene mesh sometimes exhibits microcracks, flaking of fibers, and fibrosis.

Additionally, the mesh has enough strength to withstand basic actions and tissue behavior in physiological conditions, particularly during tissue regeneration through the mesh itself. The area is subjected to a variety of loads approaching from abdominal contents, pressure from abdominal/diaphragm muscles, and genital organs, as well as respiratory actions. For the average, reproductive-age woman, the pelvis must withstand loads of 20 N in the supine position, 25–35 N in the standing position, and 90–130 N whilst coughing. Any mesh that is implanted in the pelvic area must be strong enough to withstand these loads.

== Regulation ==
In 2018, the United Kingdom temporarily halted vaginal mesh implants for treatment of urinary incontinence pending further investigation into the risks and available safeguards.

In the United States, the FDA reclassified transvaginal surgical mesh as "class III" (high risk) in 2016, and in late 2018, mandated premark approval applications for mesh intended for transvaginal pelvic organ prolapse repair, with further investigation planned in 2019. Then on April 16, 2019, the FDA ordered all makers of transvaginal surgical meshes to immediately stop their sale and distribution.

== Biocompatibility ==
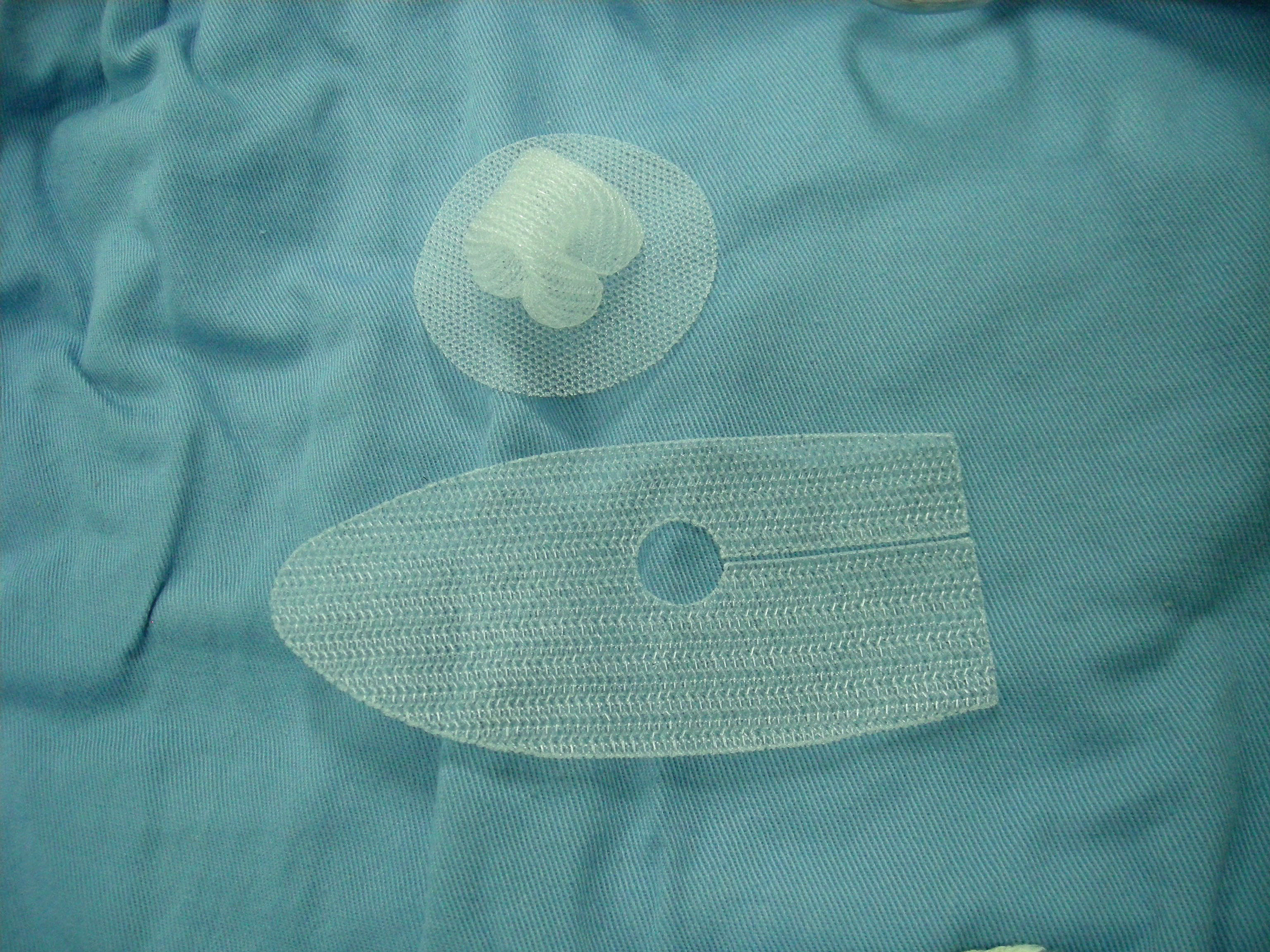
Polypropylene (PP) mesh is currently used in both hernia and pelvic organ prolapses, but may not always be the most biocompatible option.

Mesh implantation will naturally generate an inflammatory response to the inserted mesh, but biocompatibility ranges from how easily it is integrated to how severe the foreign body reaction is. A minimal response includes the formation of fibrosis around the prosthesis (much like in scar tissue formation); this response is generated with the best form of biocompatibility. A physical response triggers an acute inflammatory reaction, which involves the formation of giant cells and subsequently granulomas, meaning that the tissue is "tolerating" the mesh fairly well. Lastly, a chemical response allows for a severe inflammatory reaction during attempted tissue-mesh integration, including fibroblastic cell proliferation. Ultimately, the goal for surgical mesh creation is to formulate one that has a minimal in vivo reaction to maximize comfort for the patient, avoid infection, and ensure clean integration into the body for tissue repair.

A number of factors play into mesh biocompatibility. Mesh porosity is the ratio of pore to total area, and plays a role in the development of either bacterial infection or smooth tissue regeneration depending on pore size. Pore sizes below 10 micrometers are susceptible to infection because bacteria may enter and proliferate, while macrophages and neutrophils are too large to fit through and cannot aid in the elimination of them. With pore sizes exceeding 75 micrometers, fibroblasts, blood vessels, and collagen fibers are permitted through as part of tissue regeneration. Although there is no general consensus on the best pore size, it can be deduced that larger pores are better for development of tissue and integration in vivo.

Knowing this, the current problem with a variety of the meshes used in all types of surgeries is that they are not sufficiently biocompatible. PP proves an effective mesh for adjusting prolapsed organs, but may cause severe discomfort for the patient due to its high modulus of elasticity. This stiffens the prosthesis and results in a more pronounced inflammatory response, which complicates integration into the body with tissue ingrowth. As previously mentioned, PET too easily degrades in vivo and tissue has a difficult time integrating with PTFE. For these reasons, researchers are beginning to look for different types of surgical mesh that may be suitable for the biological environment and provide better comfort while supporting prolapsed organs.

=== PVDF (nanofibrous mesh) ===
One particular type of mesh that is under study is polyvinylidene fluoride (PVDF), or nanofibrous mesh, which has been found to be more resistant to hydrolysis and disintegration, unlike PET, and does not increase its stiffness as it ages, unlike PP. It is being tested for both hernia and pelvic/vaginal wall surgery and is produced via fiber placement layer by layer, whereas PP is constructed by a weaving-like process. This gives the nanofibrous mesh a heavyweight yet low-porosity structure, also adding greater stiffness and stress threshold when compared to PP. This is supported by the presence of HSP70—an indicator for cell stress and protector of cell formation against damage, which is beneficial for the prosthesis and tissue formation—which has been monitored and observed in a larger presence in PVDF implants. In vitro observations of nanofibrous mesh have yielded evidence of cell migration and proliferation on the set of the mesh. Successful cell growth has been noted with long fusiform shapes and clear boundaries.

A significant advantage of using nanofibrous mesh is that it can carry far more stem cells than traditional PP mesh, which could improve cell-based therapy for pelvic organ prolapse and regeneration methods. Another important advantage of PVDF is the formation of capillaries after 12 weeks, which is essential for wound healing. The faster neovascularization occurs, the faster tissue can be repaired and regenerated, which decreases the likelihood of exposure or extrusion of the mesh.

Some enhancements to PVDF must also be made before it can be used for human surgery. Although the modulus of elasticity is higher than that of PP, resulting stretch under identical stress is much less, which could cause complications such as tissue degeneration and loss of mechanical soundness. Nanofibrous mesh currently also promotes a greater foreign body reaction and inflammatory response, which compromises the biocompatibility of the mesh. For these reasons, PVDF is still under consideration and experimentation for bodily implants.

=== Reduction of inflammatory response using MSCs ===
Inflammatory responses to mesh insertion promote tissue formation around mesh fibers and proliferation of fibroblasts, polymorphonucleocytes, and macrophages, which all aid in the integration of mesh. Failures to resolve inflammatory responses may lead to foreign body reactions and the ultimate encapsulation of the implant which negates any functional purpose that the implant was supposed to serve. Mesenchymal stem cells (MSCs) are known to reduce inflammatory responses which, when combined with surgical mesh, could prevent them from getting uncontrollable and too difficult to tame. MSCs combined with surgical meshes can be used as "off the shelf" products and enhance macrophage polarization in both in vivo and in vitro environments. This can encourage an anti-inflammatory response and can regulate the inflammatory reaction associated with mesh implantation.

== Antimicrobial hernia meshes ==
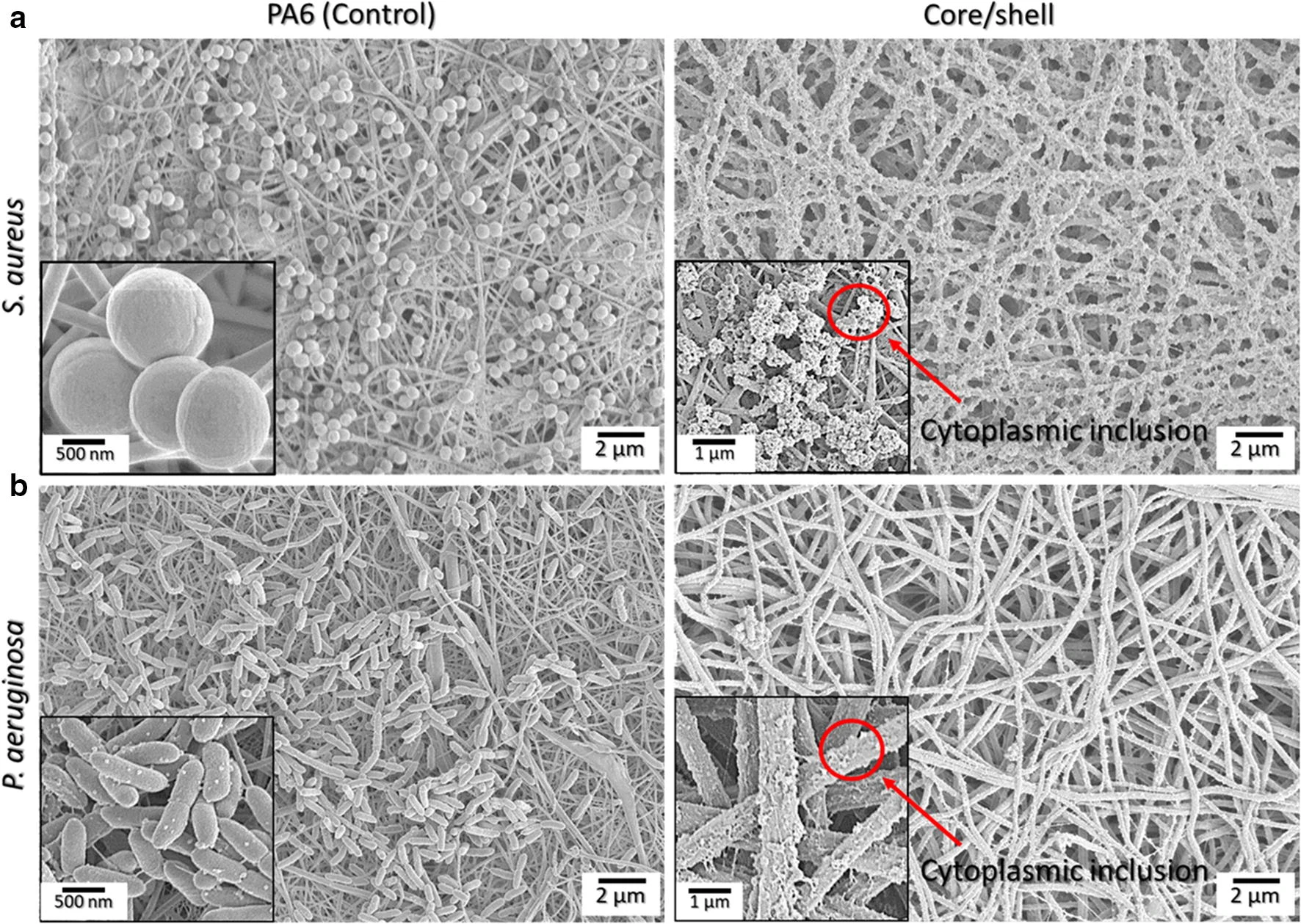
Scanning electron micrograph of electrospun bicomponent nanofibrous mesh incorporating poly(hexamethylene biguanide) and 5-chloro-8-quinolinol. The SEM micrograph presents the bactericidal effect of bicomponent nanofibers incorporating a dual drug-eluting antimicrobial system against S. aureus and P. aeruginosa.

Alongside mesh erosion, mesh migration, and enterocuteneous fistula, mesh-related surgical site infections (SSI) remain a significant healthcare problem. Approximately 60,000 inguinal and ventral hernia repairs become infected annually, with similar numbers in Europe. The CDC distinguishes among superficial SSI; which involve only the skin and subcutaneous tissue, and deep SSI when the infection can settle on the implant and thus requiring more elaborate treatment protocols.

The pathogenesis behind mesh-related contaminations is mostly due to the patient's skin or mucosa during primary incision and clinical practices. The insertion of medical devices has been found to increase the susceptibility to the uptake of adherent bacteria by a factor of 10,000 up to 100,000. In the case of hernia operations, one-third to two-thirds of the implanted mesh would be contaminated at the point of insertion, although only a small number of them will cause an infection. Many factors affect the chances of an infection incurring on a mesh material, among which the type of the surgical procedure and the location are of the highest importance. For instance, the chances of an infection incurring are 2–4% for an open inguinal repair, but as high as 10% for incisional hernia repair. Laparoscopy carries the lowest infection rate, which generally ranges below 1% and as low as 0.1%. Other factors that affect an infection's chances are the surgeon's learning curve, as a less experienced surgeon may be required longer to perform the operation and thus increase the time that the incision is exposed. Further, the type of mesh, with a vast choice of available prostheses today, could be distinguished based on the material and composition, the architecture of the filament, the absorbability, and the weight. The patient's demographics also influence the chances of an infection occurring; those include smoking, diabetes, immunocompromised, and obesity.

Predictive factors for early- and late-onset surgical site infections will encounter inflammation, fever, focal tenderness, erythema, swelling discharging pus, redness, heat, or pain. This will then be assessed by CT or MRI, followed by aspiration of fluid and culturing. Staphylococci species, and more specifically S. aureus and S. epidermidis account for approximately 90% for the incurring infections, with a prevalent presence of methicillin-resistant Staphylococcus aureus (MRSA). Gram-negative species such as Pseudomonas sp., Enterobacteriaceae are also commonly found. With multi-species biofilms also commonly encountered. If an infection settles on a mesh, administration of antibiotics is commonly ineffective, due to the blood-mesh barrier, and removal of the mesh will be required for over 40% of the deep surgical site infections.

From a material science perspective, a mesh can play a passive role towards antibacterial protection through its architecture, or an active role by combining therapeutics in the mesh's composition. For instance, monofilament meshes have been found to be twice as unlikely to adhere bacteria than multifilament meshes. As a drug delivery system, a hernia mesh can be used to deliver antibiotics, antiseptics, antimicrobials, antimicrobial peptides or nanoparticles. Different techniques can be used to implement the integration of such substances, including dipping/soaking, physical coating, chemical surface functionalization and electrospinning.

FDA Approved Antimicrobial Hernia Meshes

- MycroMesh and DualMesh Plus by GORE

== See also ==
- Adhesion barrier
- Biomesh
- Inguinal hernia surgery meshes
