= Nivå =

- Town
- Location in Denmark Nivå (Capital Region)
- Coordinates: 55°56′01″N 12°30′23″E
- Country: Denmark
- Region: Region Hovedstaden
- Municipality: Fredensborg

Area
  - Urban: 2.9 km^{2} (1.1 sq mi)

Population (2026)
  - Urban: 8,816
  - Urban density: 3,000/km^{2} (7,900/sq mi)
  - Gender: 4,205 males and 4,611 females
- Time zone: UTC+1 (CET)
  - Summer (DST): UTC+2 (CEST)
- Postal code: 2990 Nivå

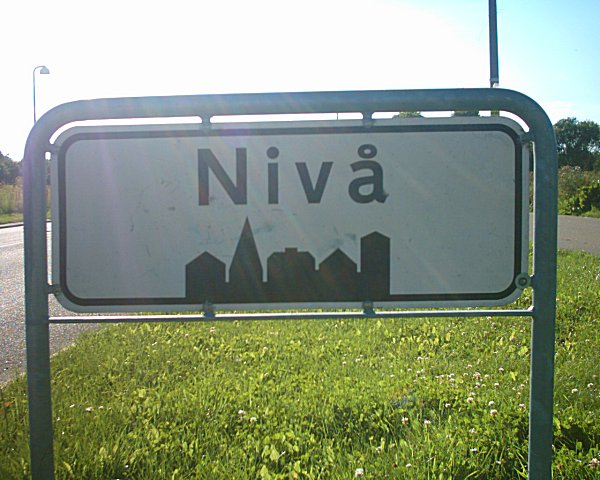

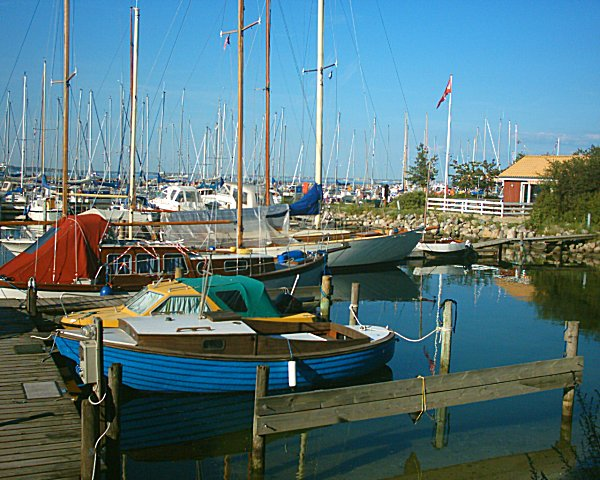

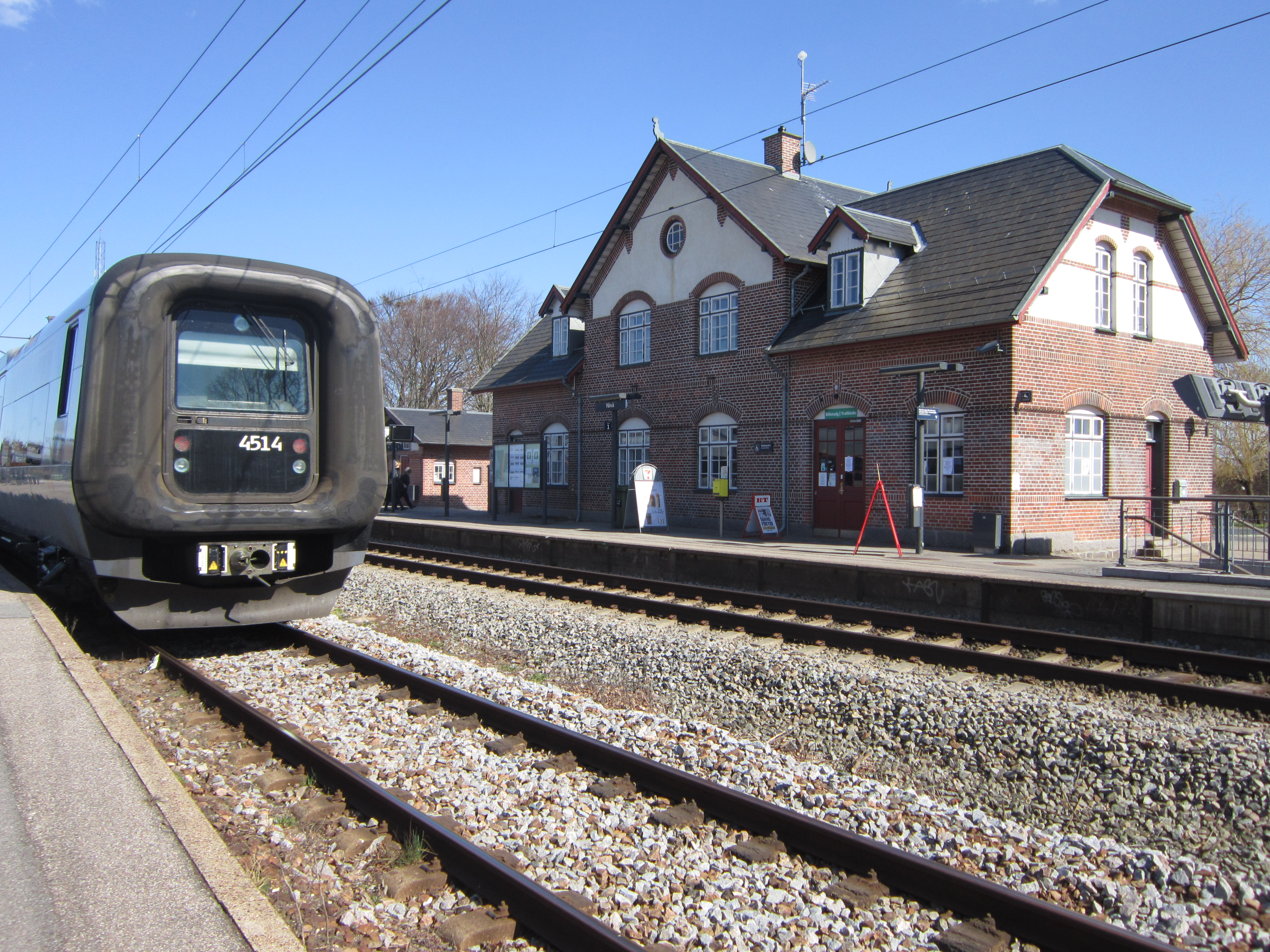

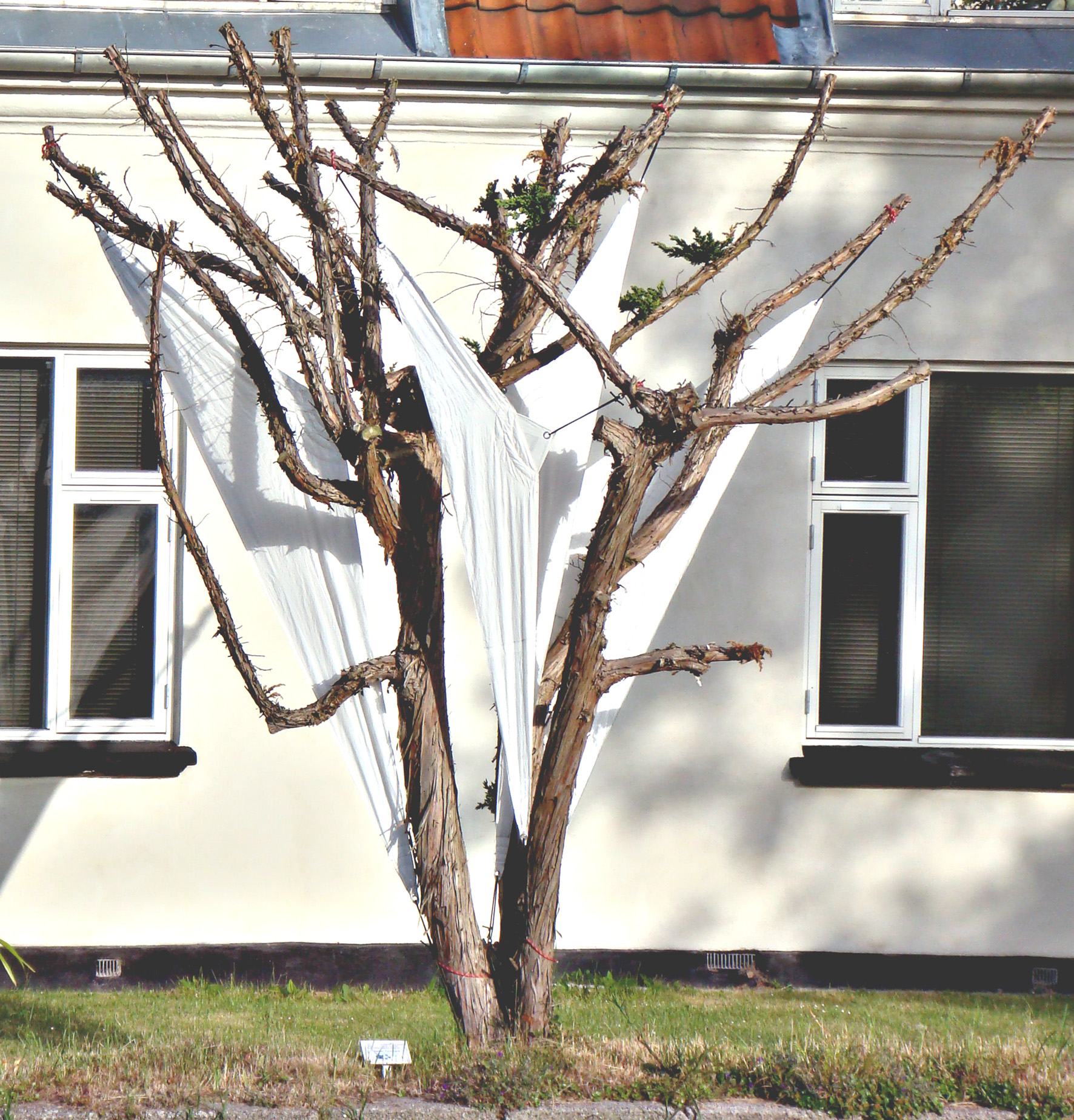

Nivå is a town with a population of 8,816 (1 January 2026) in the municipality of Fredensborg on the island of Zealand (Sjælland) in Denmark. Nivå is a residential town on the coast of the Øresund. It has a stop on the Copenhagen – Helsingør Kystbanen rail line.

The town is the site for Nivaagaard museum, a marina and a desolated shopping center by the railway station, which includes only a library and a Netto supermarket. The town possesses two schools; Nivå Skole Syd (formerly known as Nivå Centralskole) and Nivå Skole Nord (formerly known as Niverødgaardskolen), whilst a golf course lies to the West. Its landscape is varied and ranges from marshland to suburban habitations.

== History ==
For several hundreds of years (until 1980), the town and the surrounding areas and villages, lay ground to three brickyards. Today, the landscape are marked with former clay pits, which now serves as lakes and a marina bassin.

The oldest known ring oven in the world (1870) has been preserved. It used to be a part of the oldest brickyard, Nivaagaard Brickyard (in Danishg: Nivaagaard Teglværk). The brickyard is regularly open for visits each summer.

== Music ==
Nivå Musiklaug holds an annual festival at the Kalvehaven: many talented young musicians play. One of the performers playing at the 2006 event was Danish singer-songwriter Tobias Trier.

== Nivaagaards Malerisamling ==
Nivaagaards Malerisamling was opened by Johannes Hage in 1908. The house is situated in an extensive park featuring many different varieties of rhododendron. The museum houses art from the Italian and North European renaissance, Dutch and Danish Baroque, Danish Golden Age, as well as special exhibitions.

== Notable people ==
- Alfred Hage (1803–1872) a Danish merchant, politician, landowner and philanthropist; in 1859 he purchased Nivaagaard and several other farms at Nivå
- Hans-Georg Tersling (1857 in Karlebo near Nivå – 1920) a Danish architect who lived and worked on the French Riviera
- Marie Hammer (1907–2002) a Danish zoologist and entomologist, brought up on a farm in Nivå
- Lars Knutzon (born 1941) a Danish actor in the TV-series Borgen
- Lotte Bundsgaard (born 1973 in Nivå) a Danish schoolteacher, journalist and politician
- Anders Heinrichsen (born 1980 in Nivå) a Danish actor
- Cecilie Wellemberg (born 1994) a Danish model and Miss Universe Denmark 2015, lives in Nivå.
