= Fredensborg Municipality =

Municipality of eastern Denmark

Fredensborg Municipality Fredensborg Kommune (Danish)
- Municipality
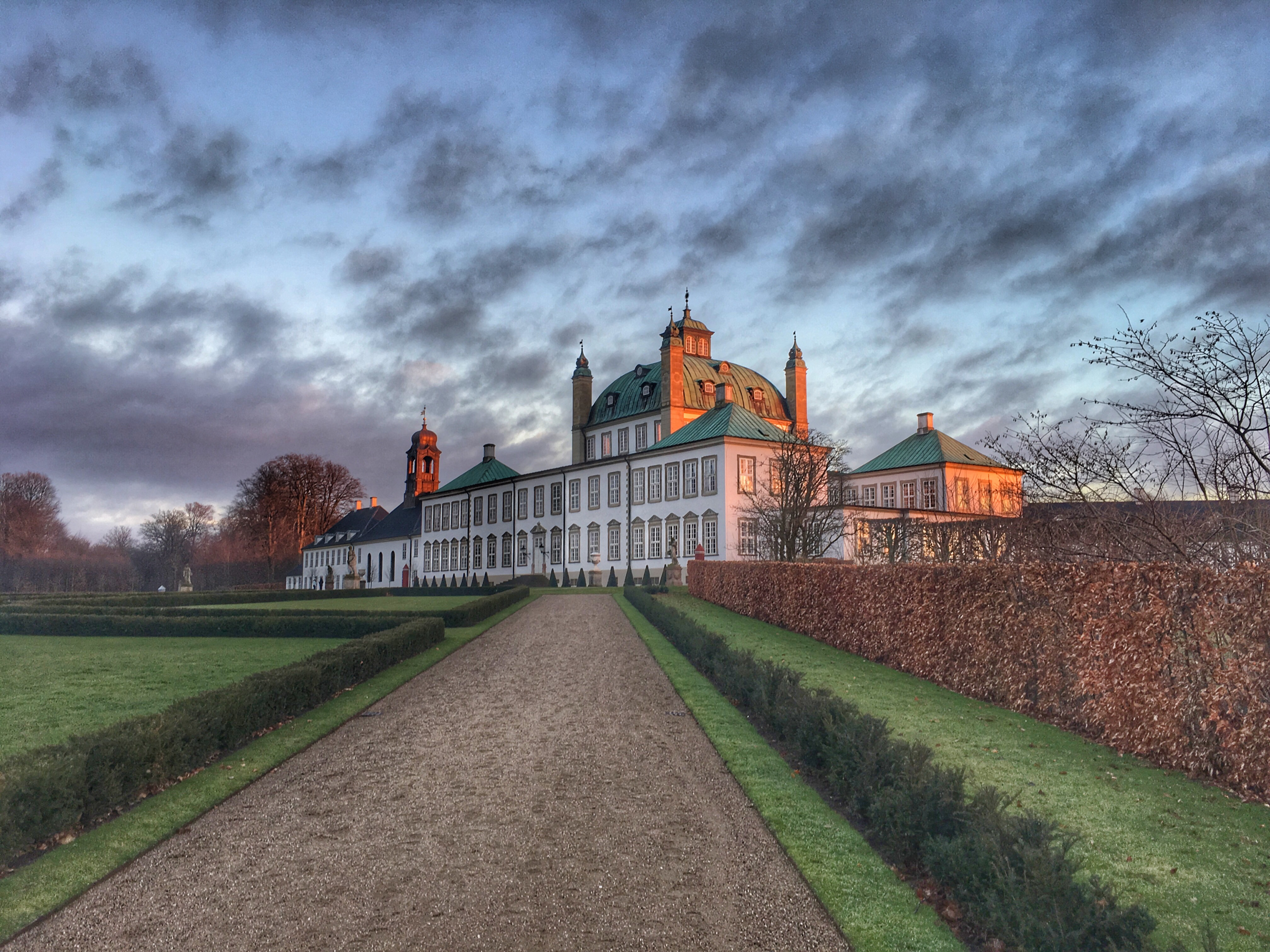

- Coat of arms

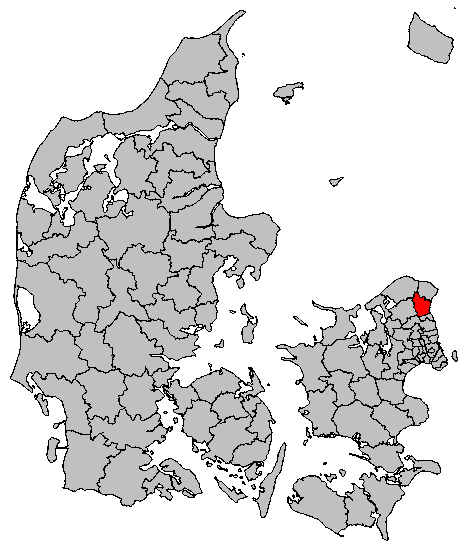
- Location in Denmark
- Coordinates: 55°58′N 12°24′E
- Country: Denmark
- Region: Hovedstaden
- Established: 1 January 2007

Government
  - Mayor: Thomas Lykke Pedersen

Area
  - Total: 112.10 km^{2} (43.28 sq mi)

Population (1 January 2026)
  - Total: 42,445
  - Density: 378.64/km^{2} (980.66/sq mi)
- Time zone: UTC+1 (CET)
  - Summer (DST): UTC+2 (CEST)
- Website: www.fredensborg.dk

Fredensborg Municipality (Danish: Fredensborg Kommune) is a municipality (Danish, kommune) in Region Hovedstaden (Capital Region). The municipality covers an area of 112.13 km^{2} and has a total population of 42,445 (as of 1 January 2026). Its mayor, since 2010, is Thomas Lykke Pedersen, a member of the Social Democrats (Socialdemokraterne) political party.

The municipality was created on 1 January 2007, in a merger of the former municipalities of Karlebo Kommune and Fredensborg-Humlebæk Kommune, switching the political powers from the conservative party to the Social Democrats.

Fredensborg Palace is the Danish Royal Family's spring and autumn residence. Queen Ingrid of Denmark and Prince Consort Henrik died there.

== Locations ==
Kokkedal	15,354
Humlebæk	9,746
Fredensborg	8,769
Nivå	8,011

== Politics ==
=== Municipal council ===
Fredensborg's municipal council consists of 27 members, elected every four years.

Below are the municipal councils elected since the Municipal Reform of 2007.

Election	Party										Total seats	Turnout	Elected mayor
Election	A	B	C	D	F	I	L	O	V	Ø	Total seats	Turnout	Elected mayor
2005	8	2	4		2		1	1	9		27	70.7%	Olav Aaen (V)
2009	8	2	4		4		1	1	7		27	67.8%	Thomas Lykke Pedersen (A)
2013	9	2	2	1	1	1		2	8	1	27	74.6%	Thomas Lykke Pedersen (A)
2017	10	3	2		1	1		2	7	1	27	73.2%	Thomas Lykke Pedersen (A)
Data from Kmdvalg.dk 2005, 2009, 2013 and 2017

== Attractions ==
The best known attraction in the municipality is the Louisiana Museum of Modern Art.

== Twin towns – sister cities ==
Fredensborg is twinned with:

- Bad Berleburg, Germany
- Håbo, Sweden
- Ingå, Finland
- Nittedal, Norway
- Paide, Estonia
- Sudbury, England, United Kingdom
