= Løwe House =

Building in Copenhagen

- Løves Gård
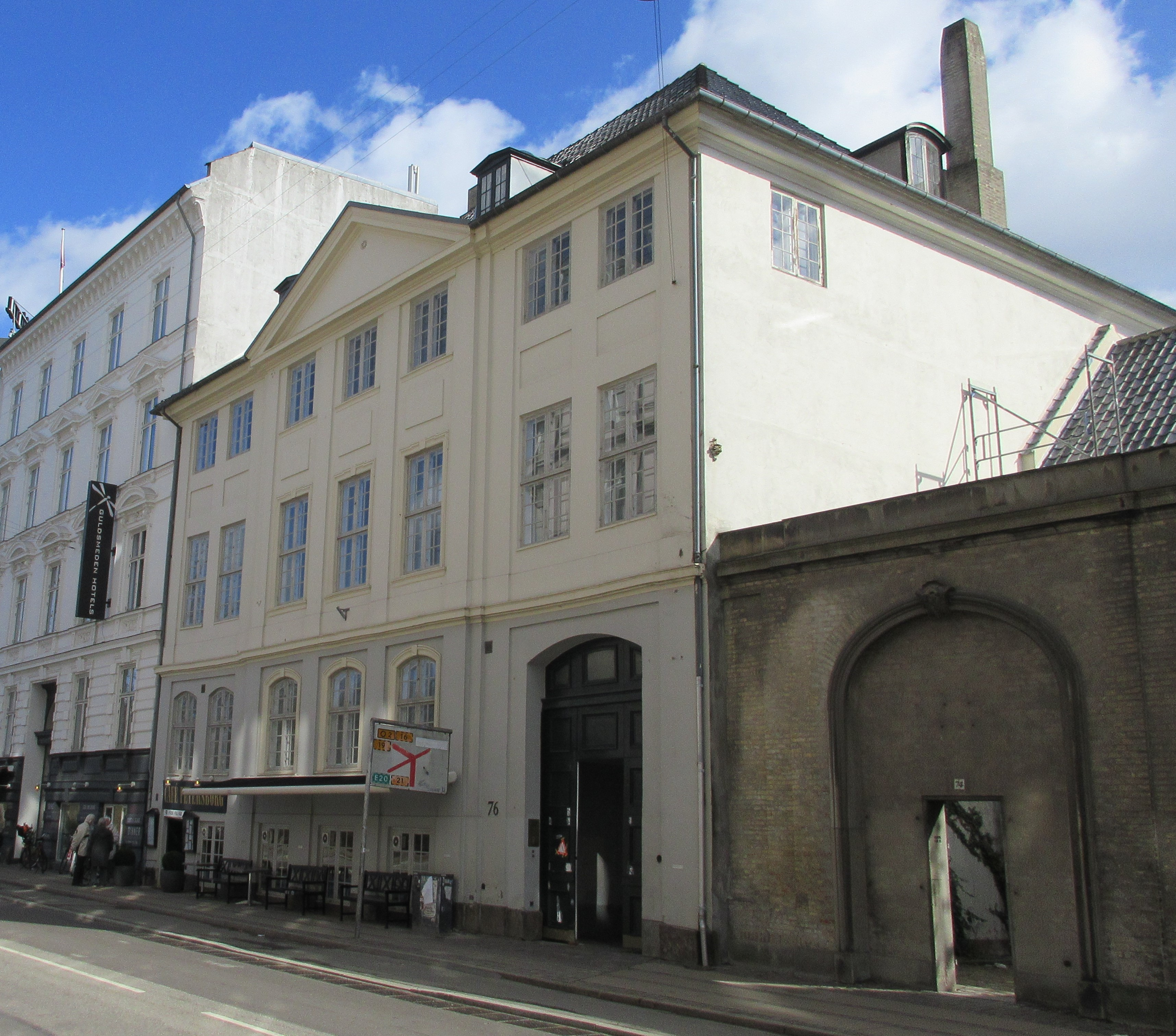

General information
- Architectural style: Neoclassical
- Location: Bredgade 76, Copenhagen, Denmark
- Coordinates: 55°41′13.67″N 12°35′36.68″E
- Completed: 1757
- Owner: Jeudan

The Løwe House (Danish: Løwes Gård) is an 18th-century townhouse located at Bredgade 76 in the Frederiksstaden neighborhood of central Copenhagen, Denmark. The Royal Danish Naval Academy was based in the building from 1827 to 1865. It was listed on the Danish registry of protected buildings and places by the Danish Heritage Agency on 22 June 1991.

== History ==
=== 17th century ===
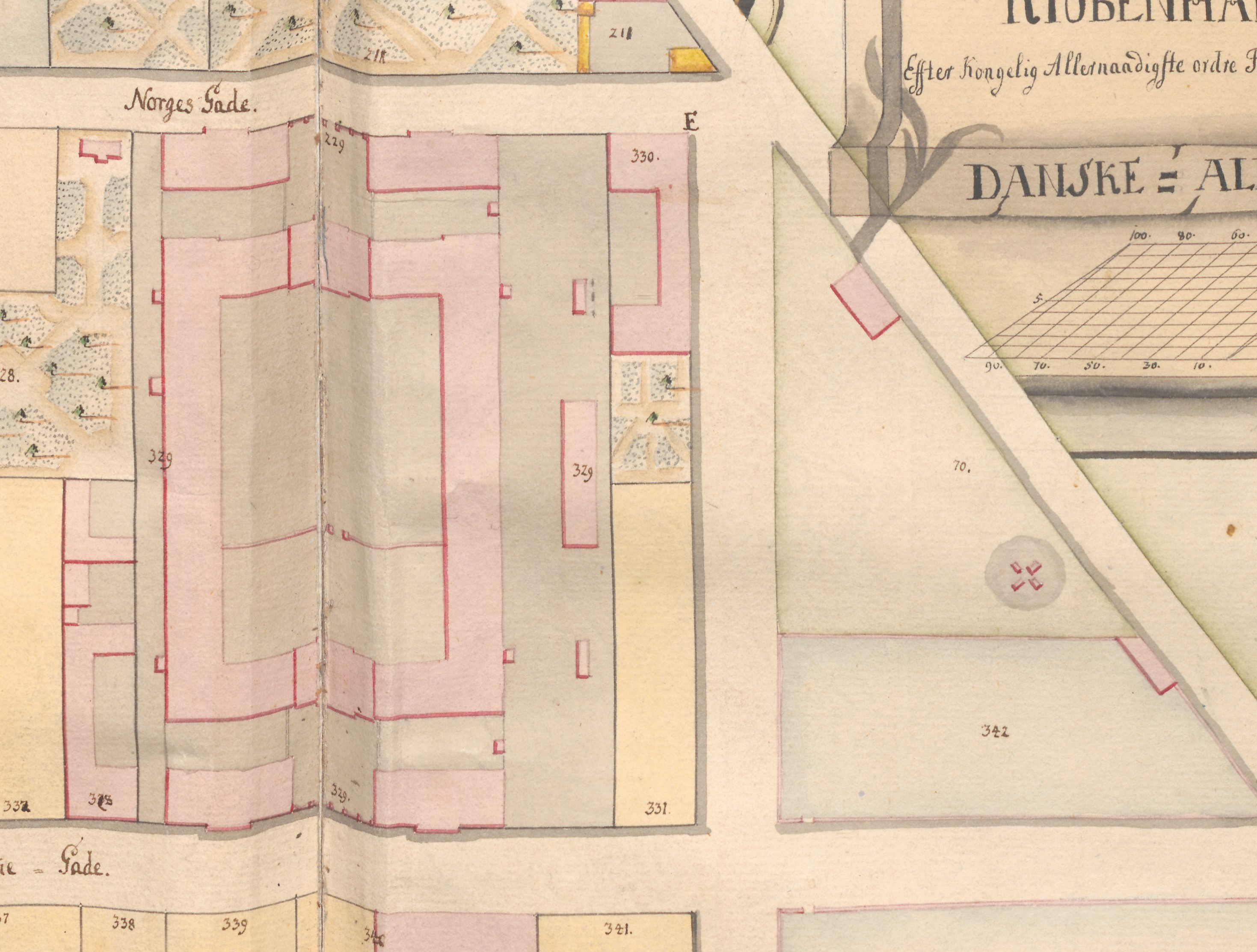
No. 339/331 seen in a detail from Christian Gedde's map of St. Ann's Rast Quarter, 1757

The property was formerly part of the extensive Sophie Amalienborg gardens. The present building on the site was constructed in 1754–1757 for customs appraiser Christian Frederik Løwe. It was conveniently located close to the Custom House. His property was listed in the new cadastre of 1756 as No. 71 HH and No. 71 II in St. Ann's East Quarter. The two properties were marked as No. 330 and No. 331 on Christian Gedde's 1757 map of St. Ann's East Quarter.

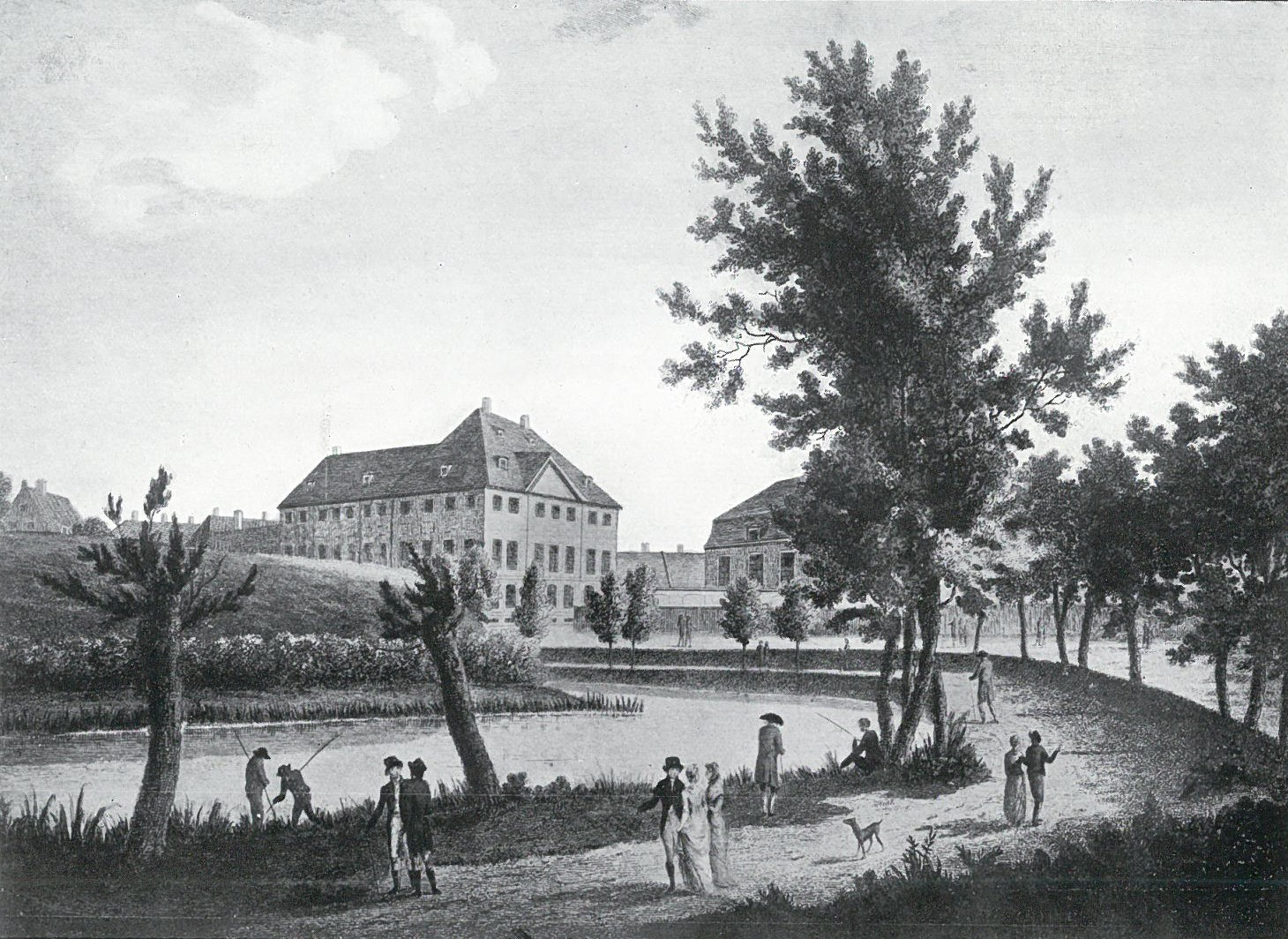
The building in the 1790s

The property was later acquired by major Adam Søbøtker. He also owned the country houses Hummeltofte, Marienborg and Rustenborg. At the 1787 census, Søbøtker resided in the building with the unmarried woman Ane Marie Phillippine von Dumrecker, husjomfru Sophie Magdalene Winterberg, cooper (bødkersvend) Hans Piilegaard, a caretaker, a housekeeper, a gardener and the gardener's wife and 32-year-old daughter.

Søbøtker resided in the building until at least 1801.

The property was later acquired by Christiane Friderica (née Holst, 1747–1817). She was the widow of etatsråd Enevold Berregaard Lugge (1718–1788) and the daughter of commander-captain Johan Christopher Holst (1705–1862). In the new cadastre of 1806, her property was listed as No. 183 in St. Ann's East Quarter.

=== Royal Naval Academy, 1827–1865 ===
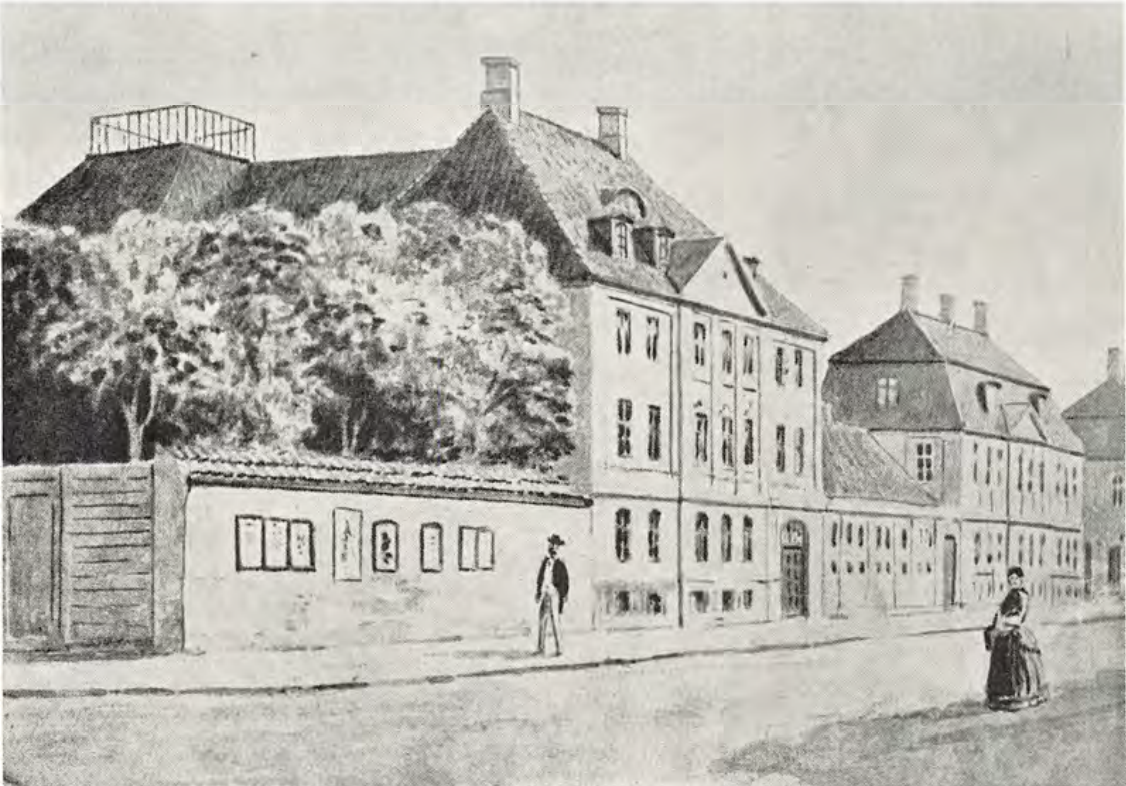
The Royal Danish Naval Academy in Norgesgade

The Royal Danish Naval Academy relocated to the building in April 1827. From 1677, the academy had been based in one of the four Amalienborg mansions but this building was converted into a new residence for Prince Frederick (VII) in conjunction with his engagement to Frederick VI's youngest daughter.

Peter Frederik Wulff (1774–1842) was appointed head of the Royal Danish Naval Academy at the same time. The writer Hans Christian Andersen was a close friend of the Wulff family. He lived with them for a while after returning from his first major journey abroad in 1834. He moved in on 10 August and moved to Nyhavn 20 (then Nyhavn 280) on 1 September.

The property was home to 27 residents as of the 1840 census. Peter Frederik Wulff resided in the building with his wife Jette Wulff, their sons Christian N. Wulff and Peter H. C. Smith, one male servant and one maid. Christian C. Paludan, who was second-in-command at the academy, resided in the building with his wife Hanne Jacobine Paludan, their 18-year-old daughter Karen Elisabeth Paludan, 21-year-old naval cadet Waldemar Grev Holck, 15-year-old naval cadet Heinrich J. Rambusch and one maid. Niels Olsen, inspector at the Admiralty, resided in the building with his wife Marie Lund and their two children (aged six and 16). The junior officers Edvard Hensen, Christian Schønheyder, Johan C. Tuxen, Christian Kraft, Wilhelm Pedersen and Eiler C. Groth as well as the cadet Philip Schultz were also residents of the building. Niels Andersen, a concierge at the Admiralty, resided in the building with his wife Anne Skriver, their two children (aged two and 14) and one maid.

At the time of the 1845 census, No. 173 A was home to a total of 19 people. They included the naval officers Christian captain Carl Paludan (1802–1817), captain lieutenant Christoph L. Prøsilius (1803–), lieutenant David Kall (1826–), first lieutenant Hermann Ipsen (1808) and second lieutenant Johan Philip Schultz (1820–). The theologian Harald Ipsen (1813–) was also a resident in the building.

=== Later history ===
The Løwe House in 1972.

In the 1920s, Toro Oil Corporation Denmark Limited A/S was based in the building, which was owned by Carl F. Glad. He resided with his wife Grethe at Store Mariendal in Hellerup and was also the owner of the country house Rågegården in Rågeleje. The company went bankrupt in connection with the Great Crash of 1929.

The company M.B. Cohn A/S was later based in the building. The company moved to new premises at Vallensbækvej 65 in 1981.

The building was listed on the Danish registry of protected buildings and places by the Danish Heritage Agency on 22 June 1991.

== Architecture ==
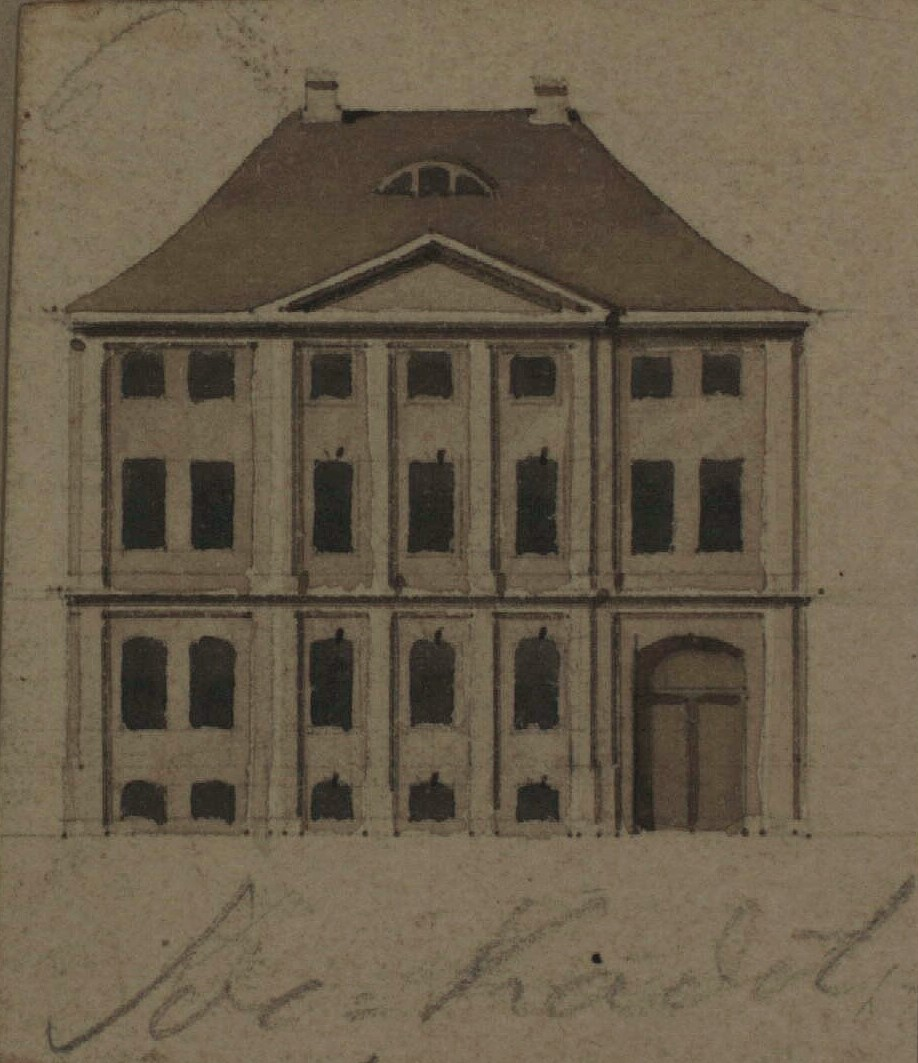
Drawing from 1732

The building has a simple, Neoclassical facade with a three-bay median risalit crowned by a triangular pediment. The two-bay gate opens to a long narrow courtyard. The side wing along its north side was originally two buildings but they were merged into one building in the 1820s. At the far end of the courtyard is a former stable and carriage house.

== Today ==
The building is owned by Jeudan and has been converted into a 948-square-metre (10,200 sq ft) office building.

=== Café Petersborg ===
The restaurant Petersborg is located in the cellar. In 1995 Hillary Clinton visited the restaurant as the guest of Lone Dybkjær during Bill Clinton's official visit to Denmark.

== Gallery ==
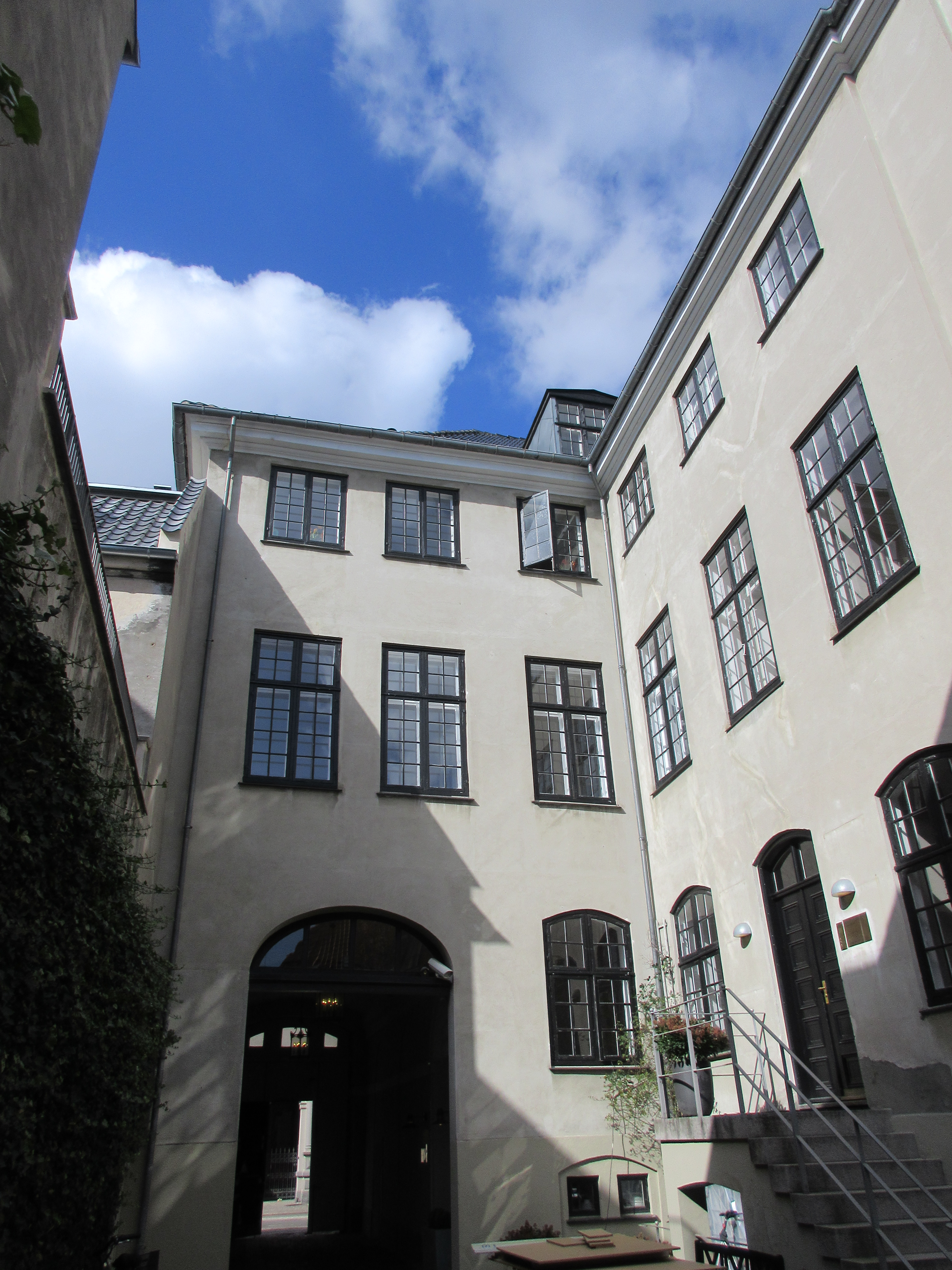
The front wing viewed from the first courtyard

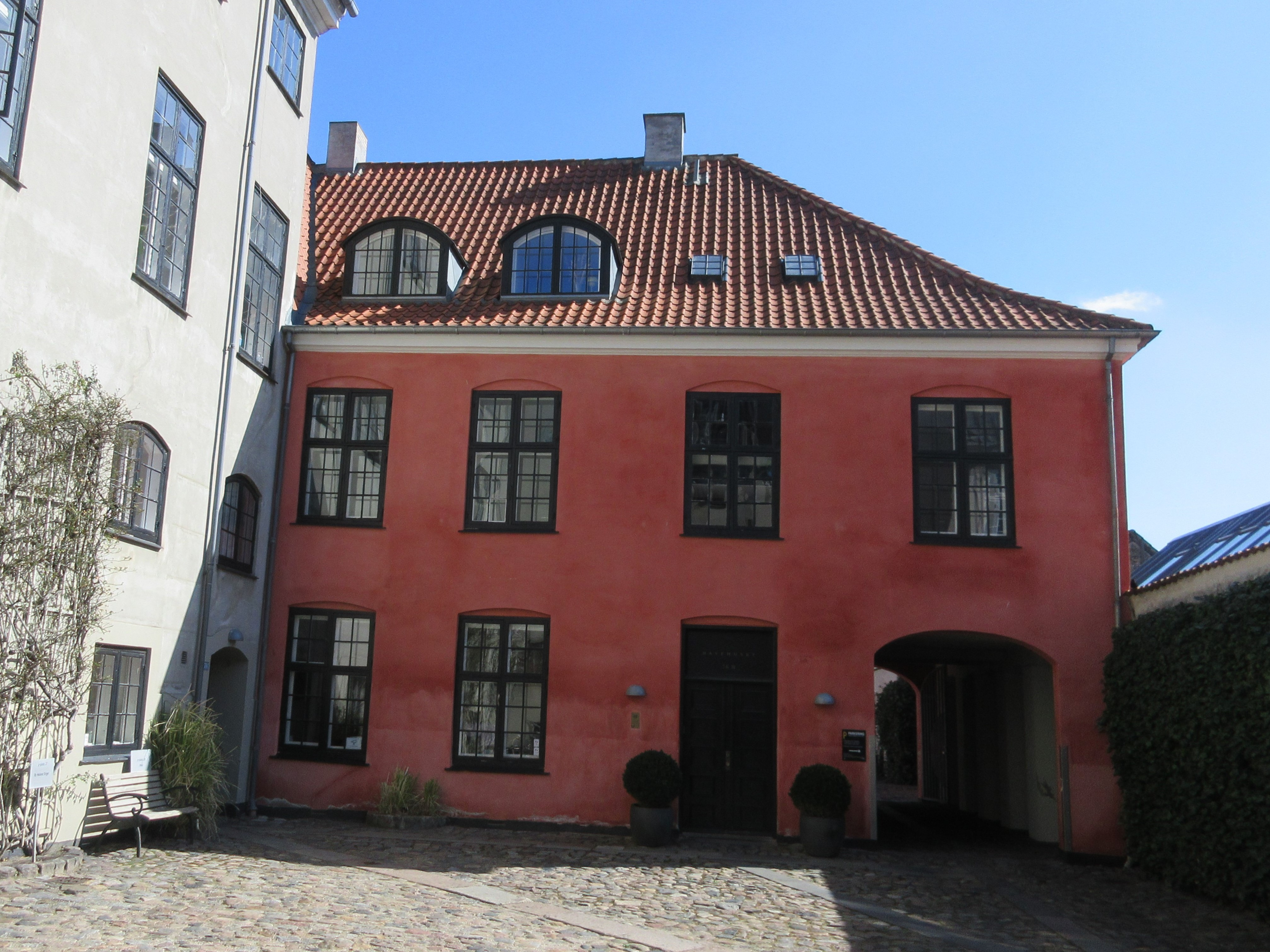
The rear wing viewed from the first courtyard

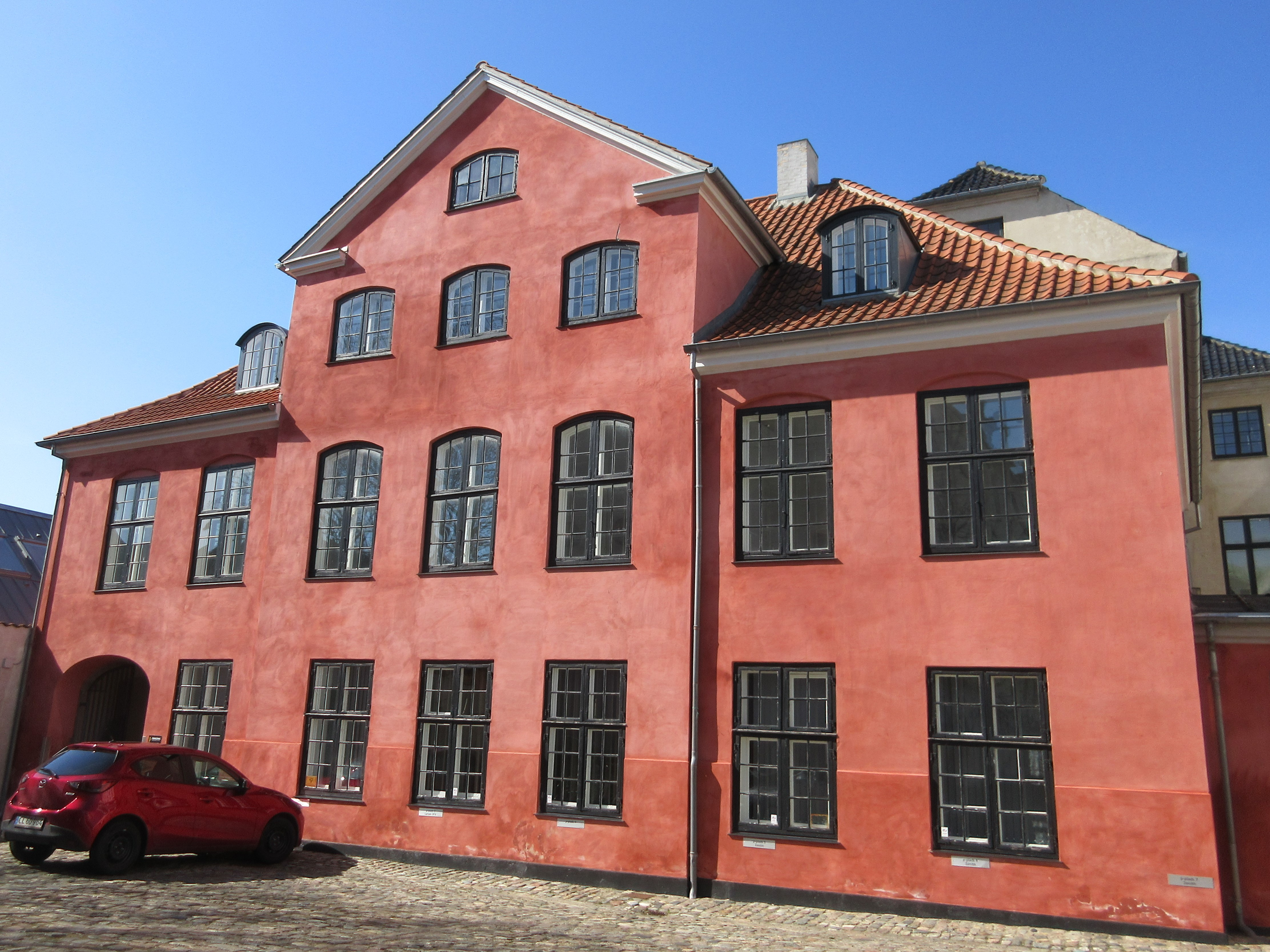
The rear wing viewed from the second courtyard
