= Rågegården =

House in Rågeleje, Denmark

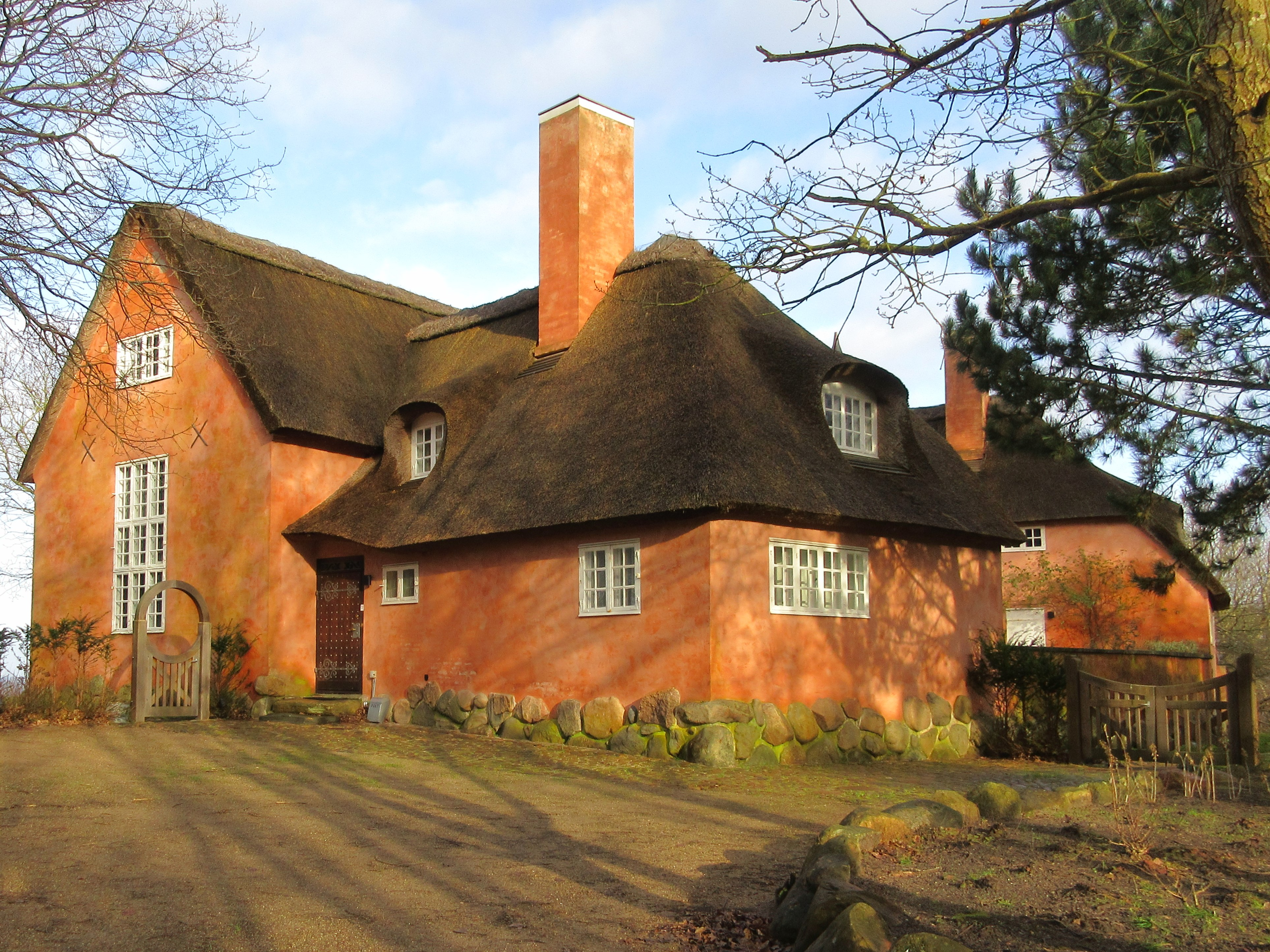
- Interactive map of the Rågegården area

General information
- Architectural style: Arts & crafts
- Location: Rågeleje, Denmark
- Coordinates: 56°6′21.92″N 12°10′42.64″E
- Completed: 1915

Rågegården is an Arts & Crafts inspired country house from 1915 situated on the eastern outskirts of Rågeleje, Gribskov Municipality, some fifty kilometres northwest of Copenhagen, Denmark. The house is perched on a small wooded hill, overlooking the Kattegat coast. It was listed on the Danish registry of protected buildings and places in 1989. The scope of the heritage listing was expanded in 2012.

== History ==
=== Henri Odewahn ===
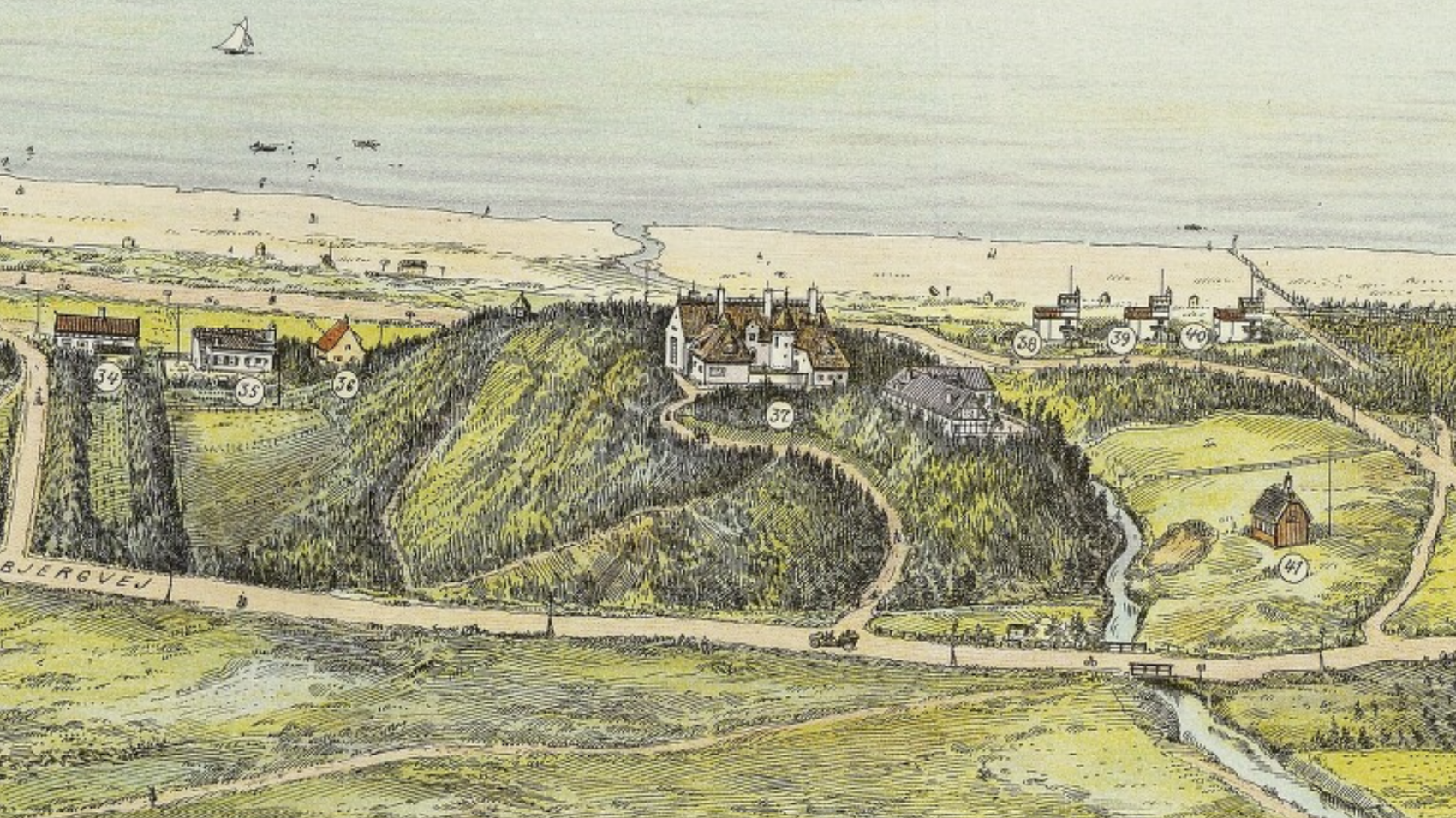
Rågegården seen on a detail from a bird's-eye view drawing by Franz Šedivý, 1915

Henri Odewahn, one of the owners of C. J. Carøe, a leading Danish importer of tea and spices, purchased a 7 hectares piece of land at the site in 1914. A country house designed by Povl Baumann was completed on the property the following year. Based at Strandgade 36 in Copenhagen, C. J. Carøe's Cingalla Tea was one of the leading tea brands on the Danish market at the time. In 1907, Odewahn had also established a brand of cherry liqueur under his own name. He purchased the property at Ny Kongensgade 3 in 1917 but only kept it for four years.

=== Carl and Frethe Glad ===
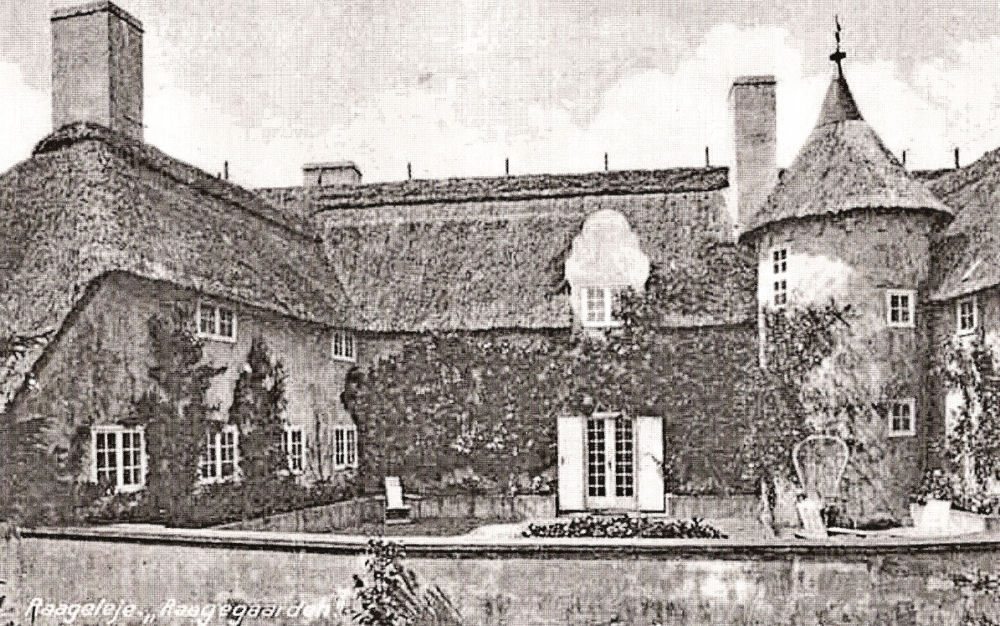
Rågegården

Rågegården was in the beginning of the 1920s acquired by Carl F. Glad (1890–1977) and his wife Grethe Glad (1891–1990). Glad was the owner of L.C. Glad og Co. and appointed as Austrian consul-general in 1921. He planted the property with flowers and other plants from Siberia. The Glad's lived at Store Mariendal in Hellerup. The Glad's belonged to Copenhagen's high society and were often featured in magazines. They covered the distance between Storee Mariendal and Rågegården in their Isotta Fraschini Tipo 8A 1925-26. Glad was also the owner of a Daimler, Bugatti and a Humber.

Glad's firm went bankrupt in connection with the Great Crash of 1929. They had to sell both their properties and moved into an apartment in Bredgade. Grethe Glad started the Margrethe School in 1931. After Carl Glad had successfully revived his business a few years later, they were in 1937 able to purchase a property at Frederiksholms Kanal and to reacquire Rågegården. Glad was also involved in the Toro Oil Corporation Denmark Limited A/S at Bredgade 76. Glad kept the Isotta Fraschini until the early 1970s when it was then sold to his Rågeleje neighbors Rita and Erik Orth.

=== Later history ===
Glad sold Rågegården to the government in 1973. Sten Bramsen, a DR producer and president of Musikalske Venners Fond, took a 10-year lease on the property in the late 1970s with the intention of operating it as a music venue but the lease was terminated prematurely after just two years.

In 1981, Rågegården was let out and used as a combined art exhibition venue and antique shop.

== Architecture ==
The property consists of a three winged main building, an L-shaped garage and stable and a small octagonal well house. The main building is designed in English cottage style with clear inspiration from the Arts & Crafts movement and Baillie Scott.

== Today ==
Rågegården is owned by a private family. The surrounding woodland, locally referred to as Glads Have (Glad's Garden), is still owned by the Danish Nature Agency.

== Cultural references ==
Most of the 1964 thriller Døden kommer til middag was shot in and around Rågegården.

== Gallery ==
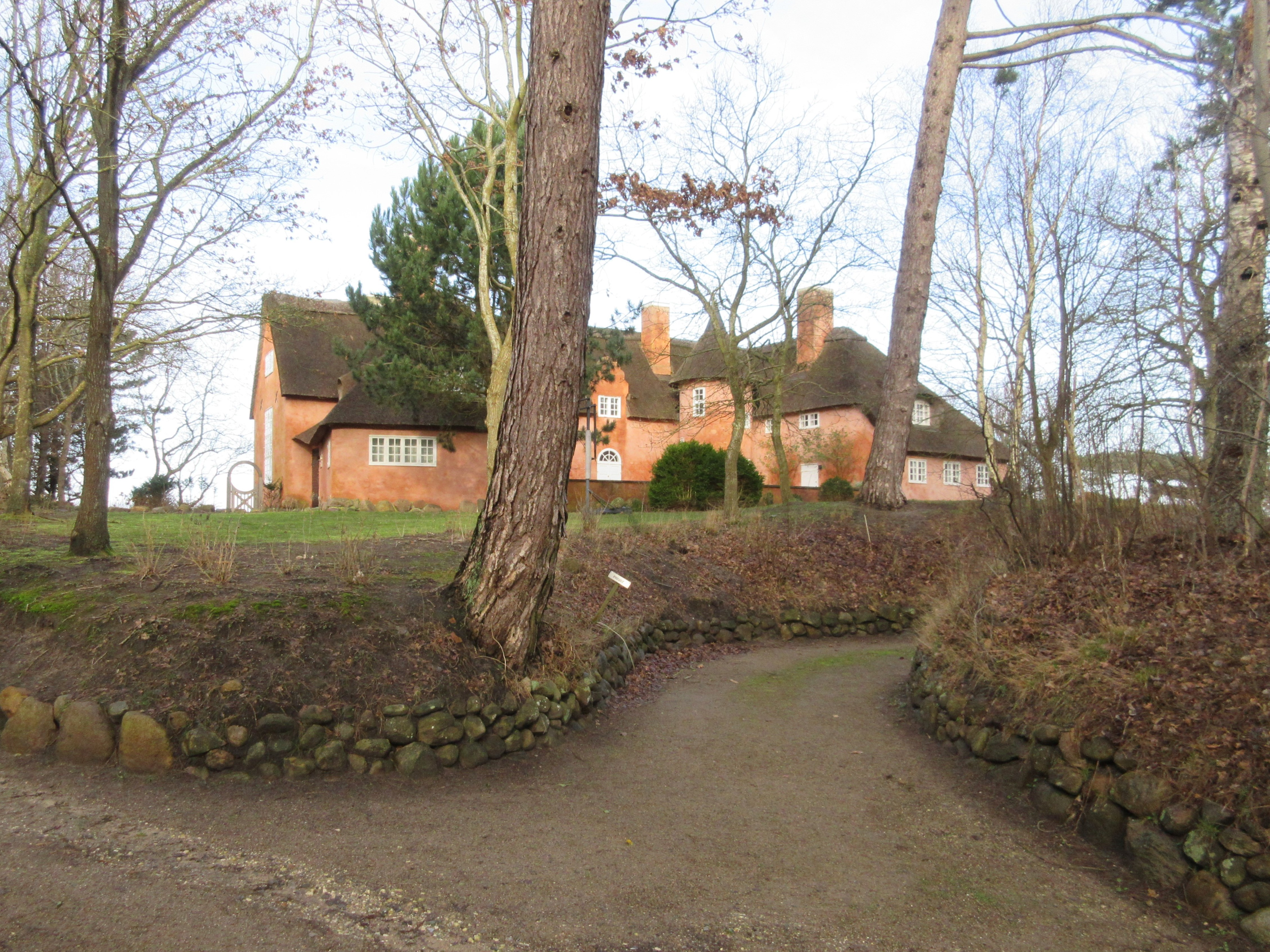
The main building seen from the driveway

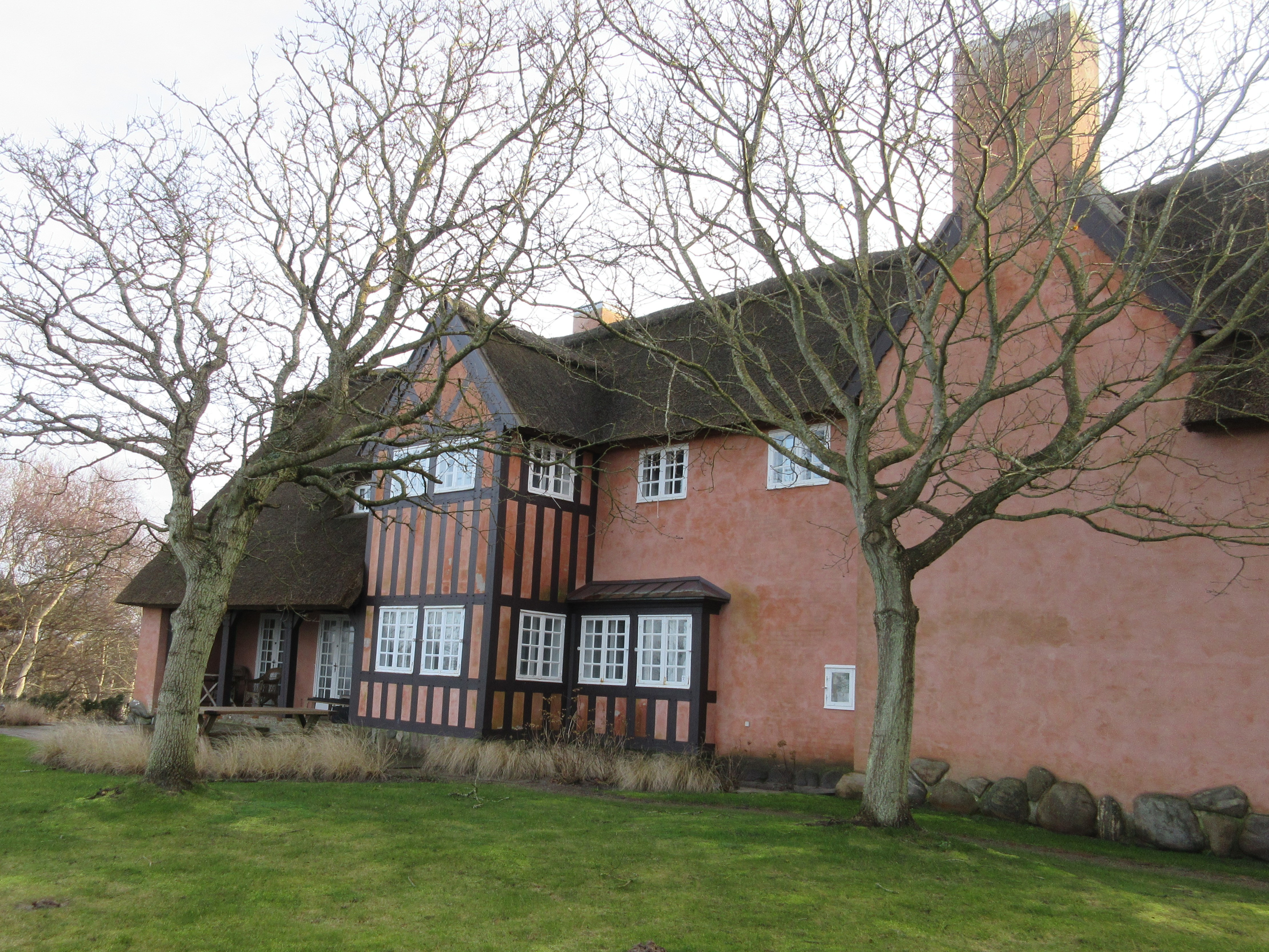
The facade towards the water

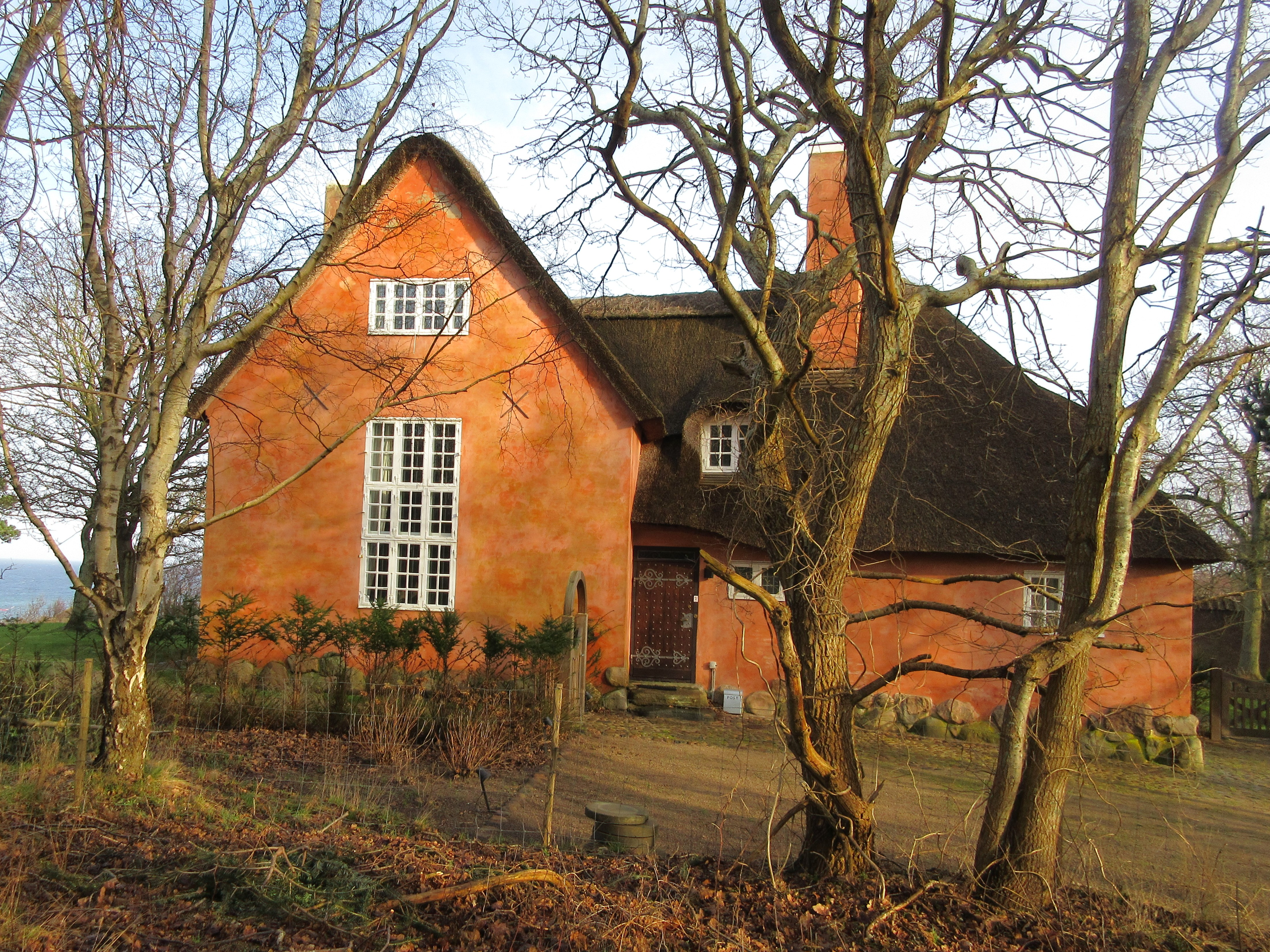
The main building seen from the west

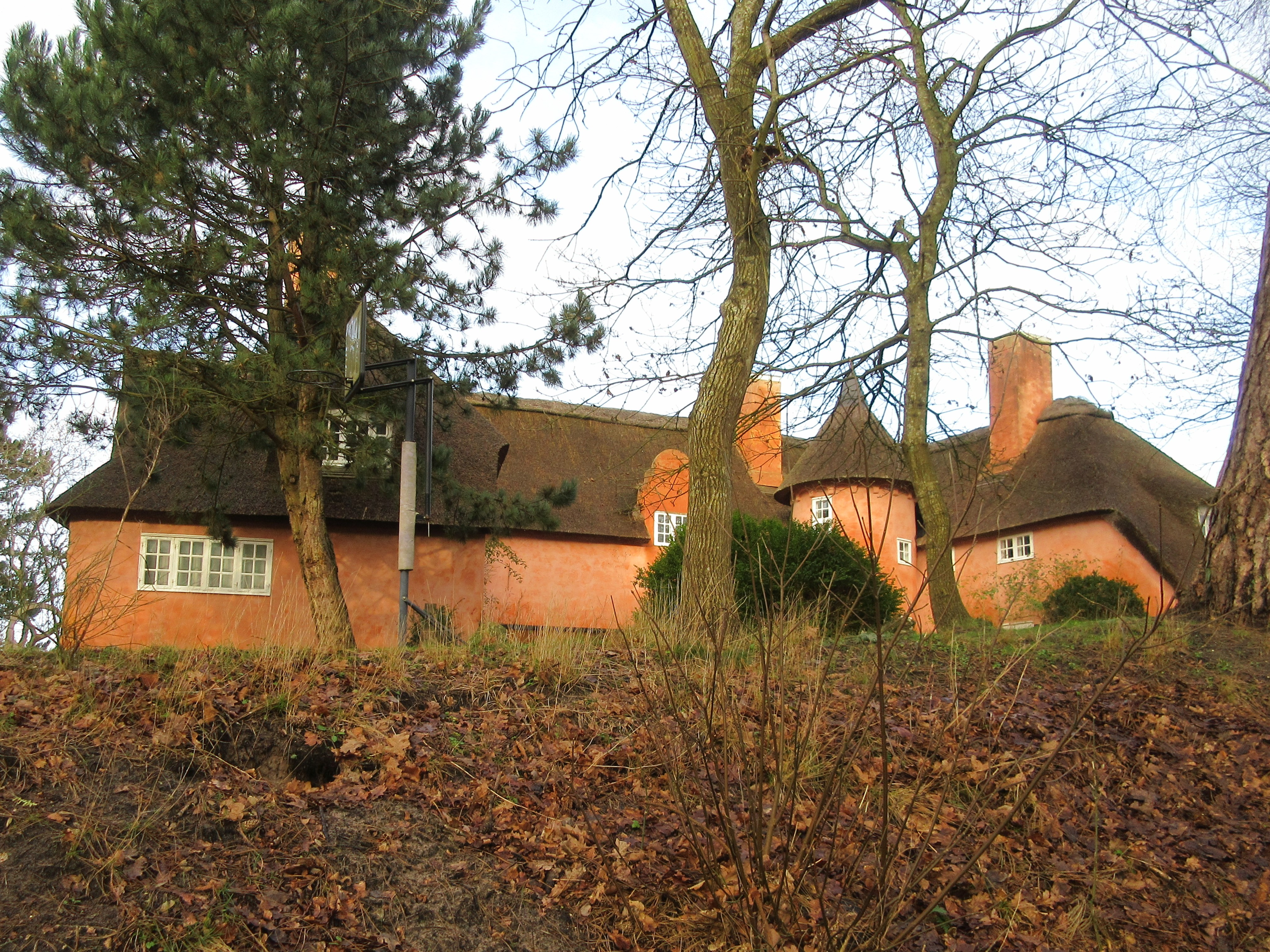
South side of the main building

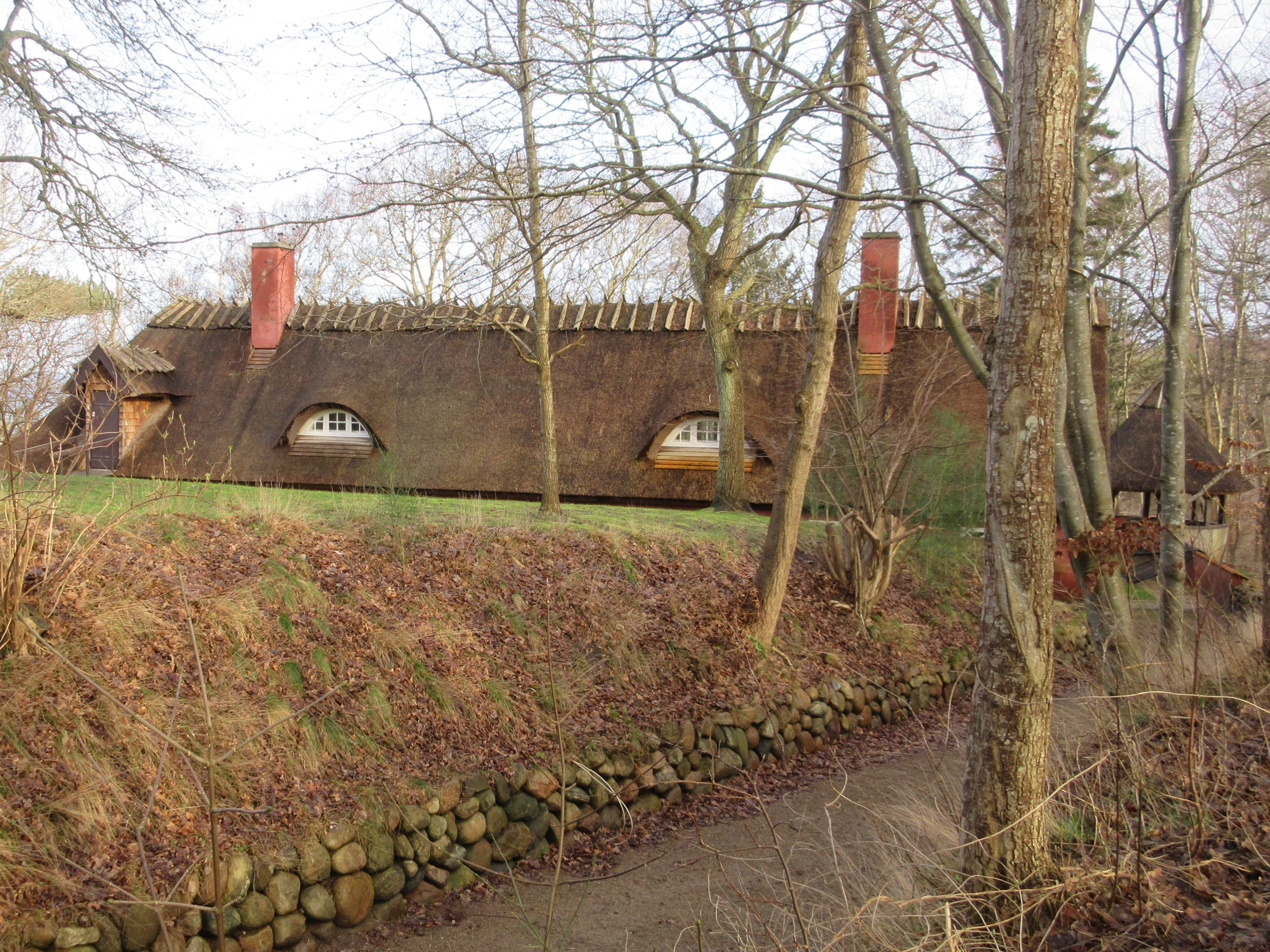
The stable wing

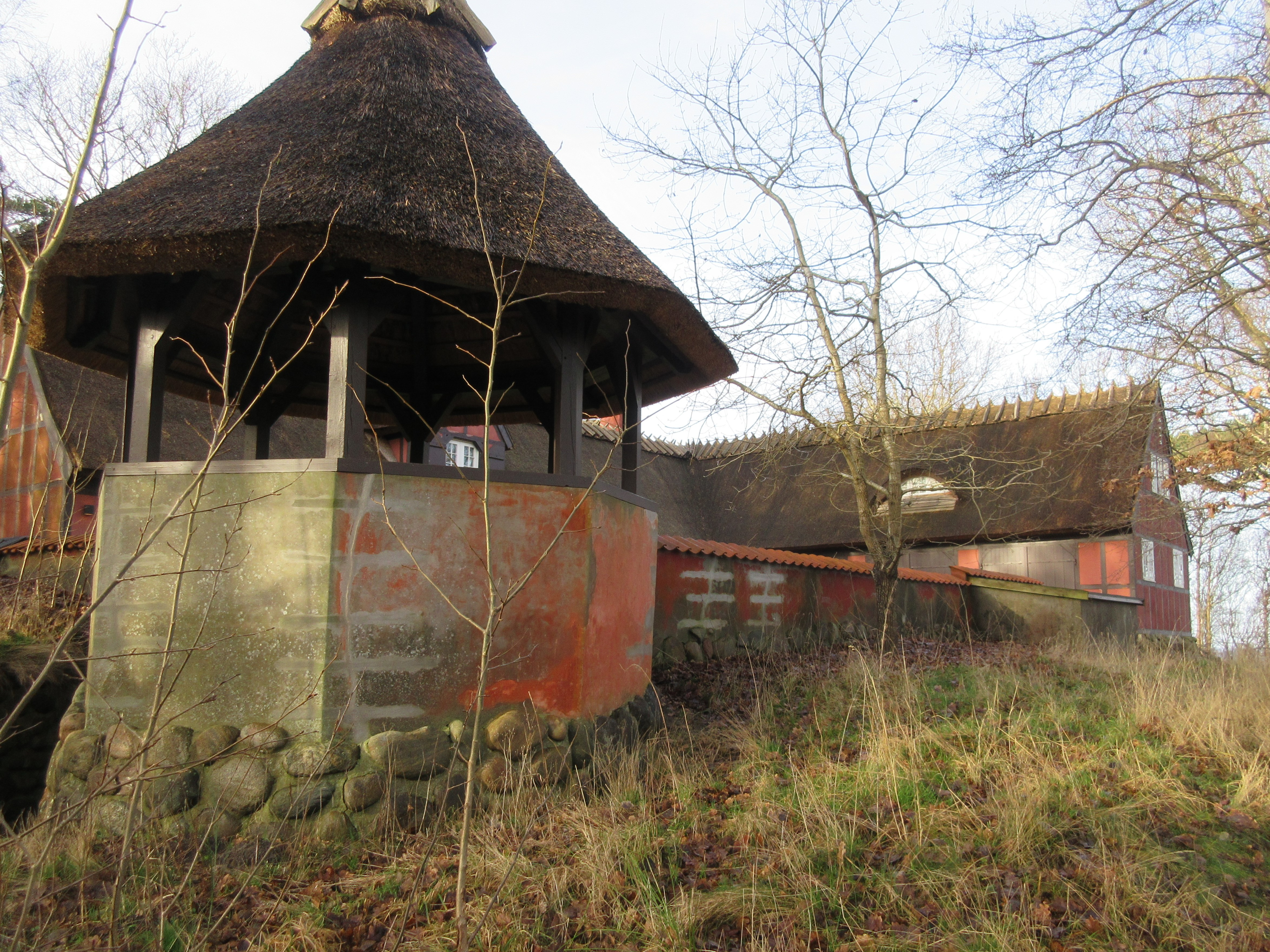
The well house and the stable

== See also ==
- Mikkelgård
