= Mikkelgård =

Building in Rudersdal Municipality, Denmark

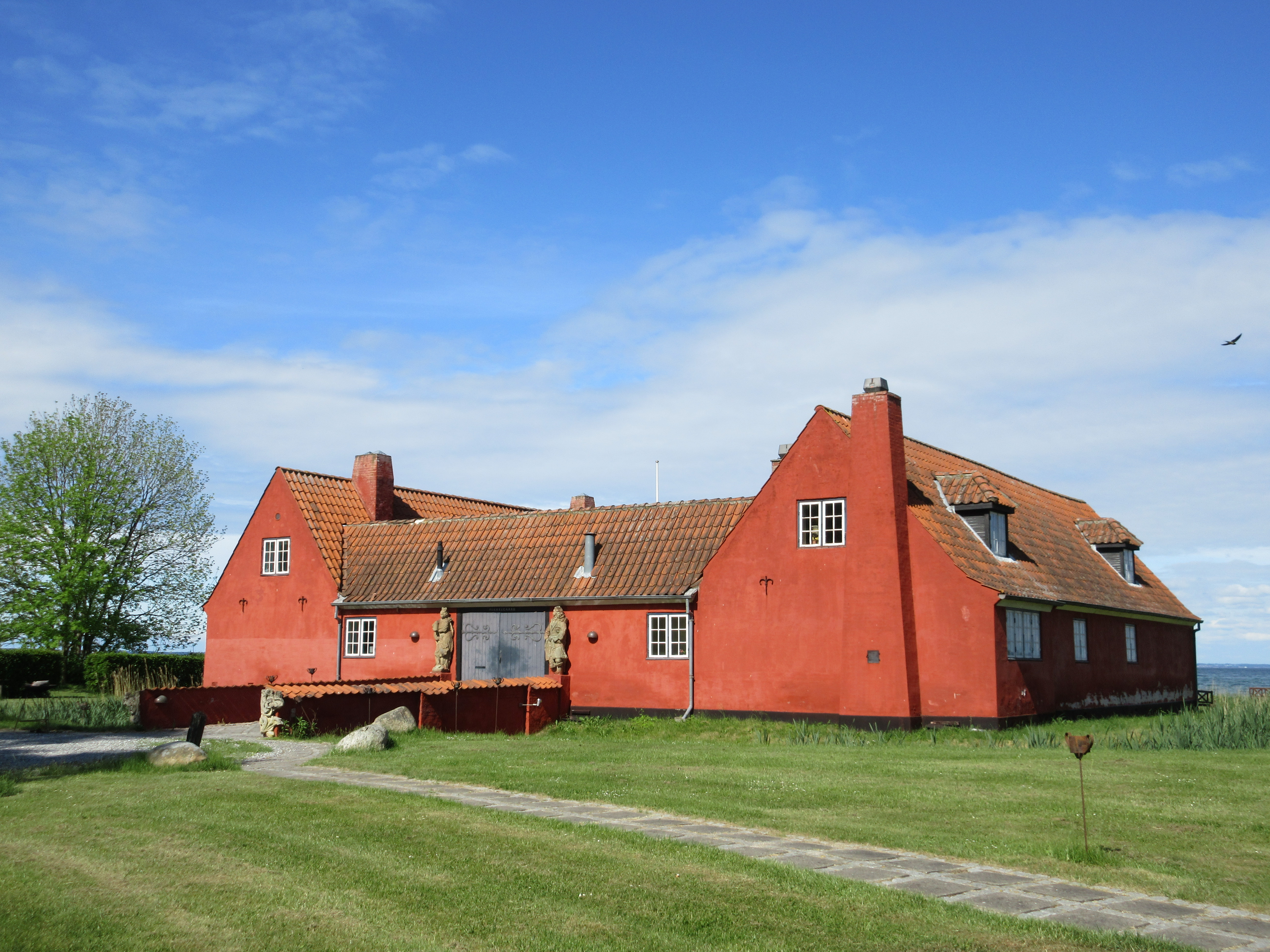
- Interactive map of the Mikkelgård area

General information
- Location: Mikkelborg, Hørsholm Municipality, Rungsted Strandvej 302, 2970 Hørsholm, Denmark
- Coordinates: 55°54′40.28″N 12°31′27.48″E
- Construction started: 1915
- Completed: 1916

Design and construction
- Architect: Povl Baumann

Mikkelgård is a former country house situated in Mikkelborg Beach Park, Hørsholm Municipality, some 25 km north of Copenhagen, Denmark. It is the former summer retreat of the composer Hakon Schmedes who named his house after the locality.

== History ==
Mikkelgård was built in 1915–16 to a design by Povl Baumann who was influenced by the Arts and Crafts movement. It is a four-winged house built with exposed timber framing facing the central courtyard.

In 1990, it was converted into a restaurant. The first head chef was Jan "Cocotte" Pedersen. The former stables were renovated in 1997 and have room for 120 dining guests.

== Architecture ==
Baumann had already been inspired by the Arts and Crafts movement in his design of the recently completed country house Rågegården at Rågeleje. In his design of Mikkelgård, he combined the influence from contemporary British architecture with inspiration from traditionaol Danish castles and manor houses. The house is surrounded by moats and is connected to the mainland by a bridge.
