= Grethe Glad =

Margrethe (Grethe) Glad née Axelholm (1891–1990) was a Danish socialite, fashion designer and educator. In 1931, she established a fashion and design school in Copenhagen, originally known as Margrethe-Skolen but now renamed the Scandinavian Academy of Fashion Design. During and after the Second World War she became active in charity work both in Denmark and France. She continued to fund charities by selling dolls dressed in historical costumes to museums in the United States and Europe. From 1977, for several years she headed the family firm L.C. Glad & Co..

== Early life and family ==
Born in Copenhagen on 5 January 1891, Margrethe Axelholm was the daughter of the successful businessman Theodor Axelholm (1854–1924) and Julie Antoinette Elisabeth Nielsen (1867–1914). She was raised with her five siblings in an upper-class home, first in the city's Frederiksberg district, later in central Copenhagen. Her father, who owned an exclusive printing firm, was a member of the city's high society.

While she had no formal education, Grethe Axelholm learnt foreign languages and took piano lessons. After marrying Harald Johannes Danjelsen in 1913, she spent a period in Switzerland before returning to Copenhagen where her husband opened a dental practice on Bredgade. On his death from the Spanish flu in December 1916, Grethe was left to bring up their two children, Carl Christian (1913) and Inger (1916). She moved to Rosenvængets Allé in the Østerbro district where she began to give lessons in embroidery and filet work, developing collaboration with the crafts department at the department store Magasin du Nord.

== Career in fashion ==
After marrying the outgoing businessman Carl Frederik Overgaard Glad on 17 October 1918, she became one of Denmark's most prominent women, not only because of her good looks and expensive attire but thanks to her active social life, theatre visits and business interests. In addition to Store Mariendal, a fine residence in Hellerup, the couple Rågegården, a seaside home in Rågeleje. Grethe earned even more attention when her husband was appointed Austria's consul general in 1921.

In 1929, after the stock market crash Carl Glad's firm declared bankruptcy. The family had to sell both residences and move into an apartment on Bredgade. After taking a course in haute couture in Paris, Grethe was able to contribute to the family income by teaching fashionable dressmaking techniques to affluent bourgeois women. This led to her establishment in 1931 of Margretheskolen (literally the Margrethe School) named after its patron, Princess Margrethe of Bourbon-Parma. The school proved to be a great success, partly as a result of growing interest in the latest fashions but also thanks to Glad's frequent visits to Paris to keep up with the latest trends and her own skills in languages and as a teacher. She also brought French designs back to Copenhagen as a basis for local manufacturing.

The school benefited from Princess Margrethe's connections with royalty, attracting sophisticated young ladies who were not only able to advance as fashion designers but could ensure their upper-class families wore the latest festive attire, winter coats and even night dresses. It soon became known for the balls held in the exclusive Hotel d'Angleterre where the ladies appeared in the gowns they had created.

== Later life ==
After Carl Glad's company was revived, in 1937 the family moved into a house on Frederiksholms Kanal and bought back Rågegården. Grethe Glad retired from involvement with the school in 1945, entrusting its leadership to Inga Madsen. During and after the Second World War she became active in charity work both in Denmark and France. She continued to fund charities by selling dolls dressed in historical costumes to museums in the United States and Europe. Following her husband's death in 1977, for several years she headed the family firm L.C. Glad & Co.

Aged 99, Grethe Glad died on 18 December 1990 in Copenhagen.
