= Linoleumshuset =

Historic townhouse in Copenhagen, Denmark

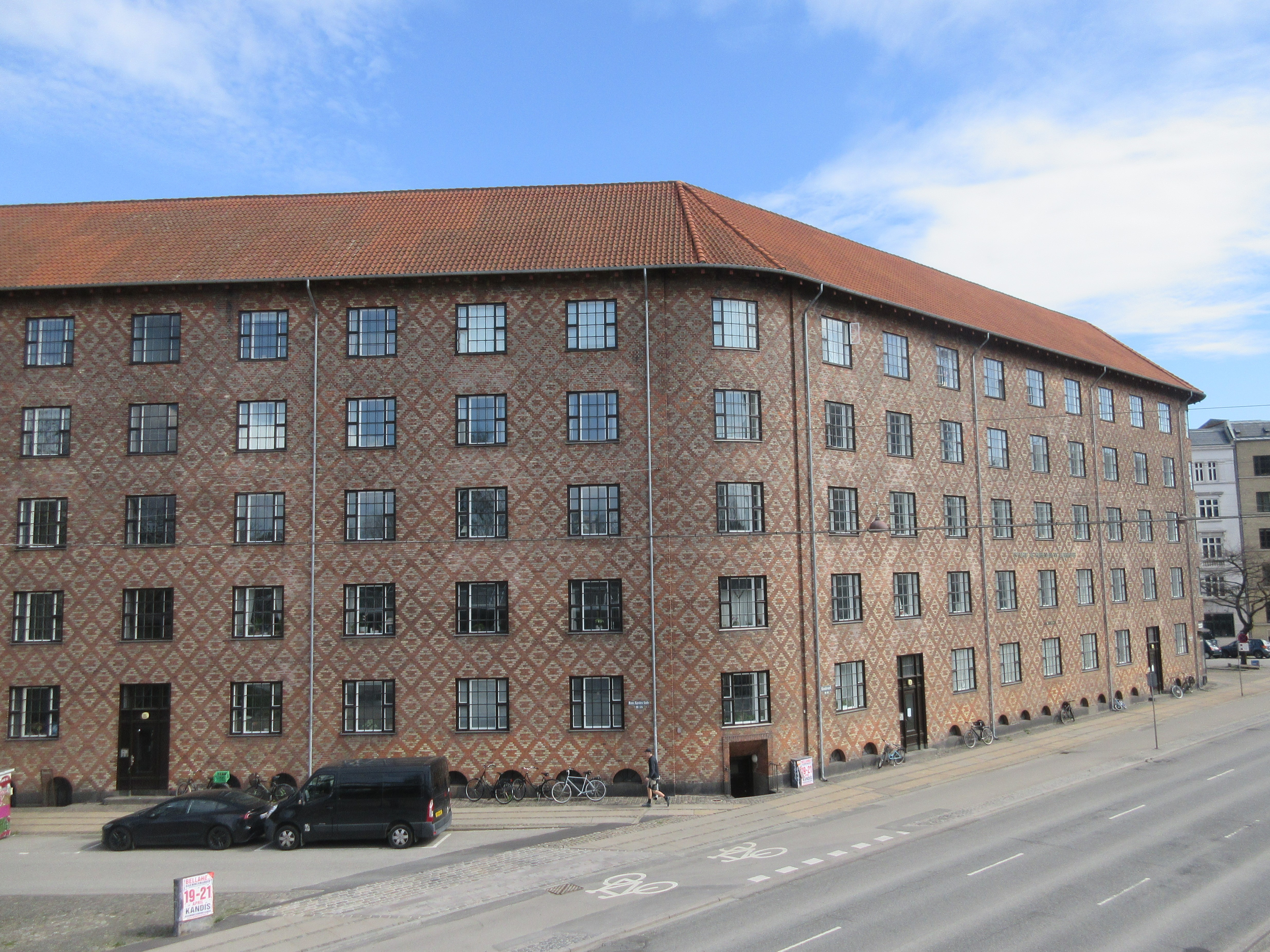
- Interactive map of the Linoleumshuset area

General information
- Architectural style: Neoclassical
- Location: Copenhagen, Denmark
- Coordinates: 55°41′9.89″N 12°32′45.35″E
- Completed: 1839–31

Design and construction
- Architect: Povl Baumann

Linoleumshuset (lit. "The Linoleum House") is a Povl Baumann-designed apartment building situated on Åboulevard, opposite University of Copenhagen's Frederiksberg Campus, in the Nørrebro district of Copenhagen, Denmark. The building forms most of an irregularly shaped perimeter block between the streets Åboulevard (No. 84-86), Hans Egedes Gade (No. 19-15), Henrik Runges (No. Gade (No. 14-18) and Jesper Brochmands Gade (No. 17). The name refers to the patterned brickwork, which resembles traditional linoleum floors. The building was listed in the Danish registry of protected buildings and places in 2009.

== History ==
The streets in the area around Rantzausgade were generally named for prominent clergymen. Hans Egedes Gade, Jesper Brochmands Gade and Henrik Rungsgade, named for Hans Egede, Jesper Brochmand and Henrik Rung, respectively, were all created between 1900 and 1910. Hans Egedes Gade followed the no longer existing railway between Copenhagen's second central station (where Axeltorv is today) and the Coast Line north of the city. Åbpulevard followed the now covered Ladegård Canal. This led to an irregularly shaped block between the four streets. The northeastern corner of the block was built over with three fairly small apartment buildings by local master craftsmen in the 1910s and 1920s. The rest of the block was used by the city for the construction of public housing. Povl Baumann was charged with designing the building. It was constructed in 1930–31.

== Architecture ==
Linoleumshuset is constructed in red and yellow brick on a plinth of granite ashlars. Baumann chose to tackle the irregular shape of the site by constructing the building with bow-shaped corners. Doors and window frames are brown-painted. The doors are topped by relatively large transom windows. The patterned brickwork is the only decorative element. Unlike what was normal at the time, its facade was stripped of all projecting elements, such as cornices, lesenes, window frames and sills. The gently sloped roof, which follows the shape of the block, is clad in red tile.

The roof was renewed with the use of traditional building methods and specially manufactured tiles in 2014–15.

== Today ==
The building is now owned by the residents through an andelsforening. ((Cooperative housing association). It comprises 98 residential apartments and two shops.

== Gallery ==
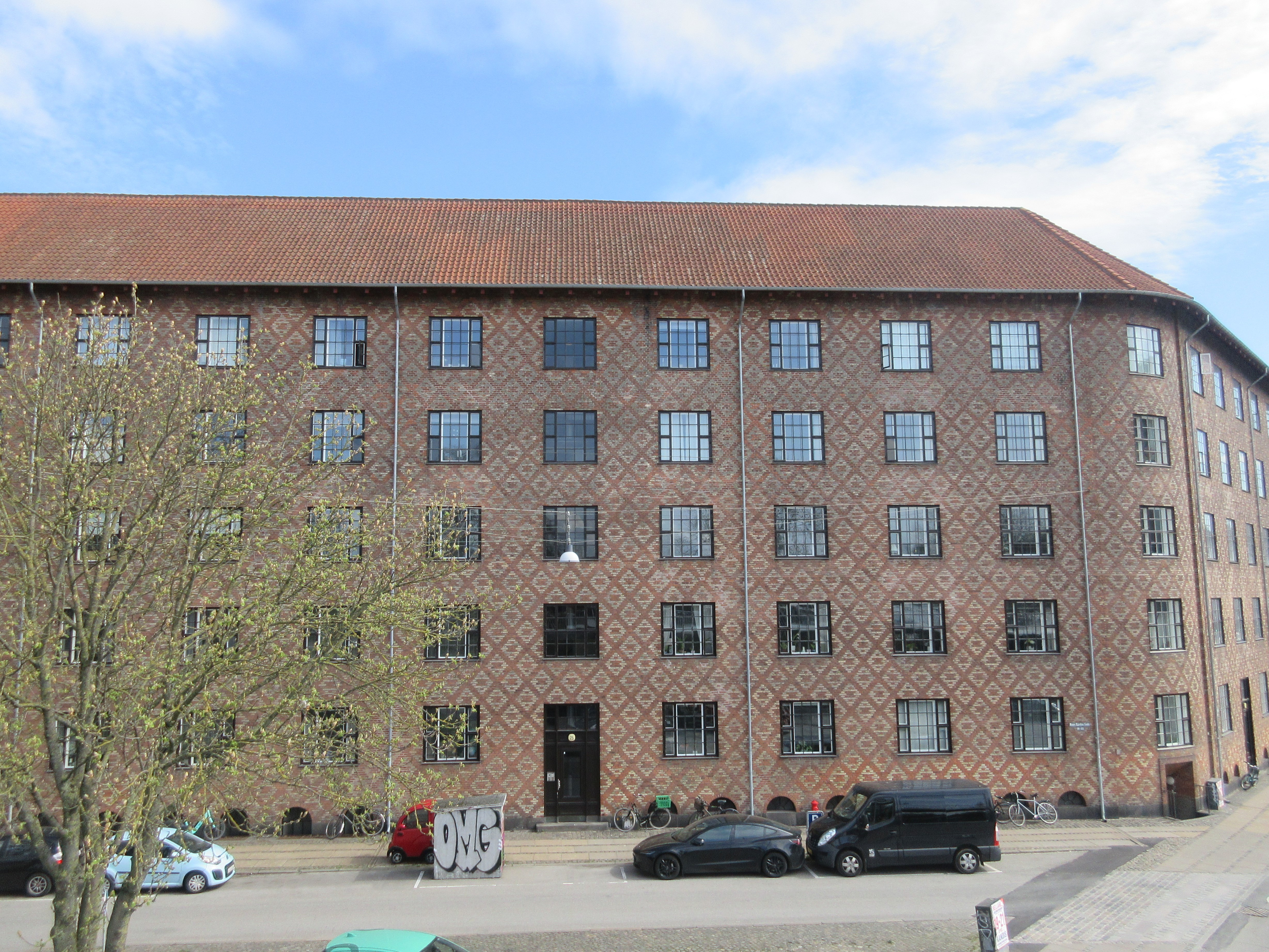

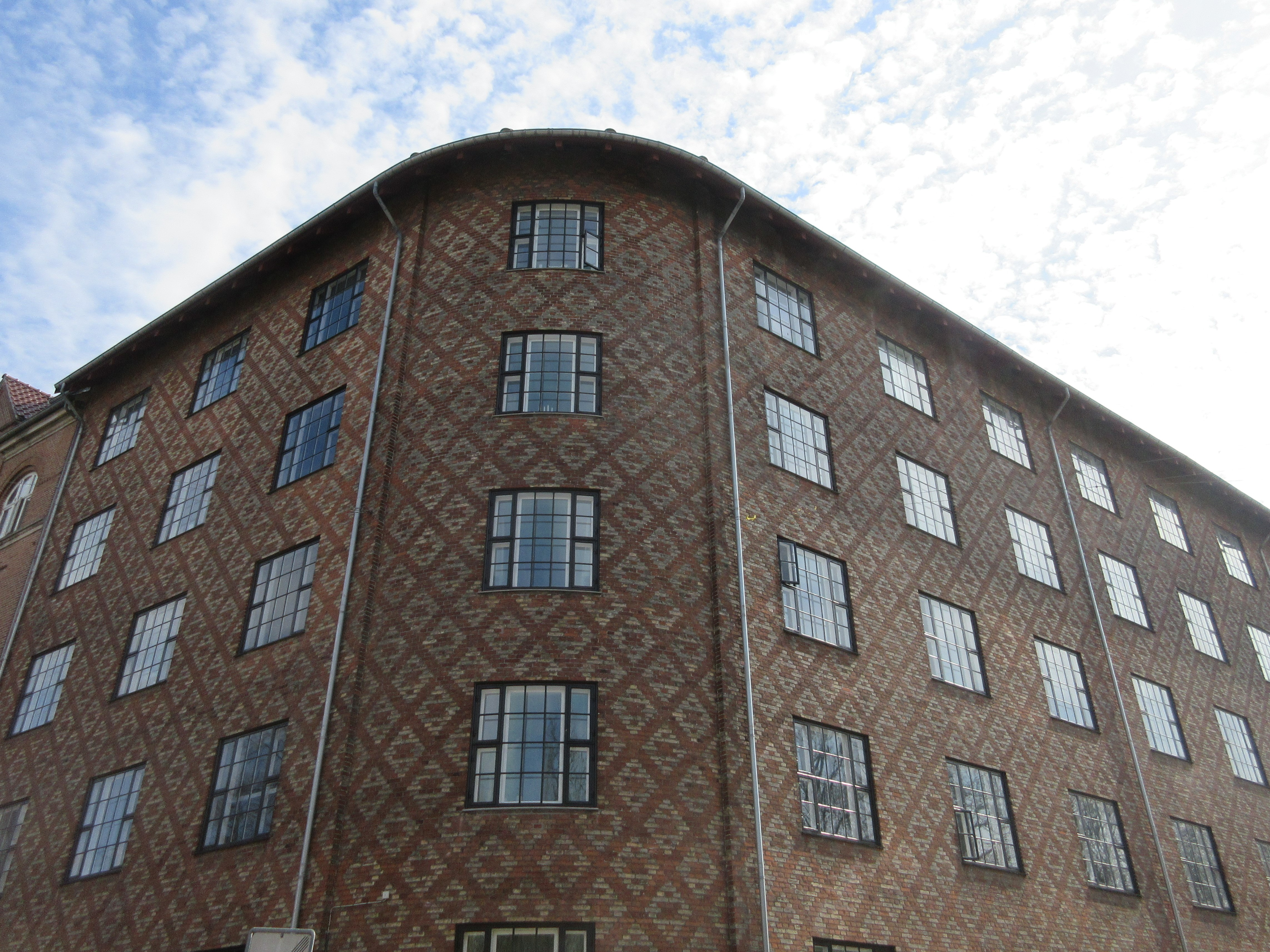

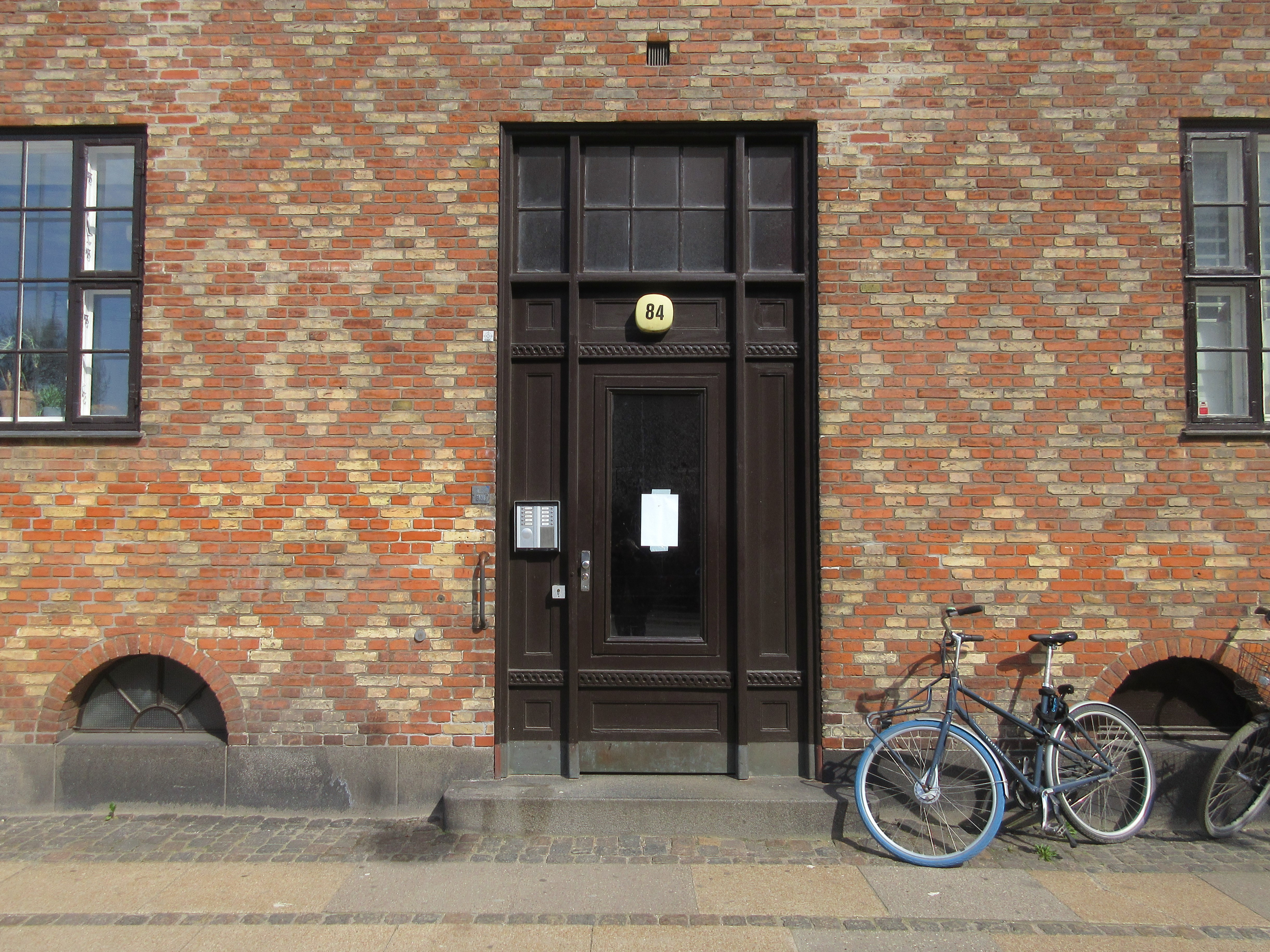

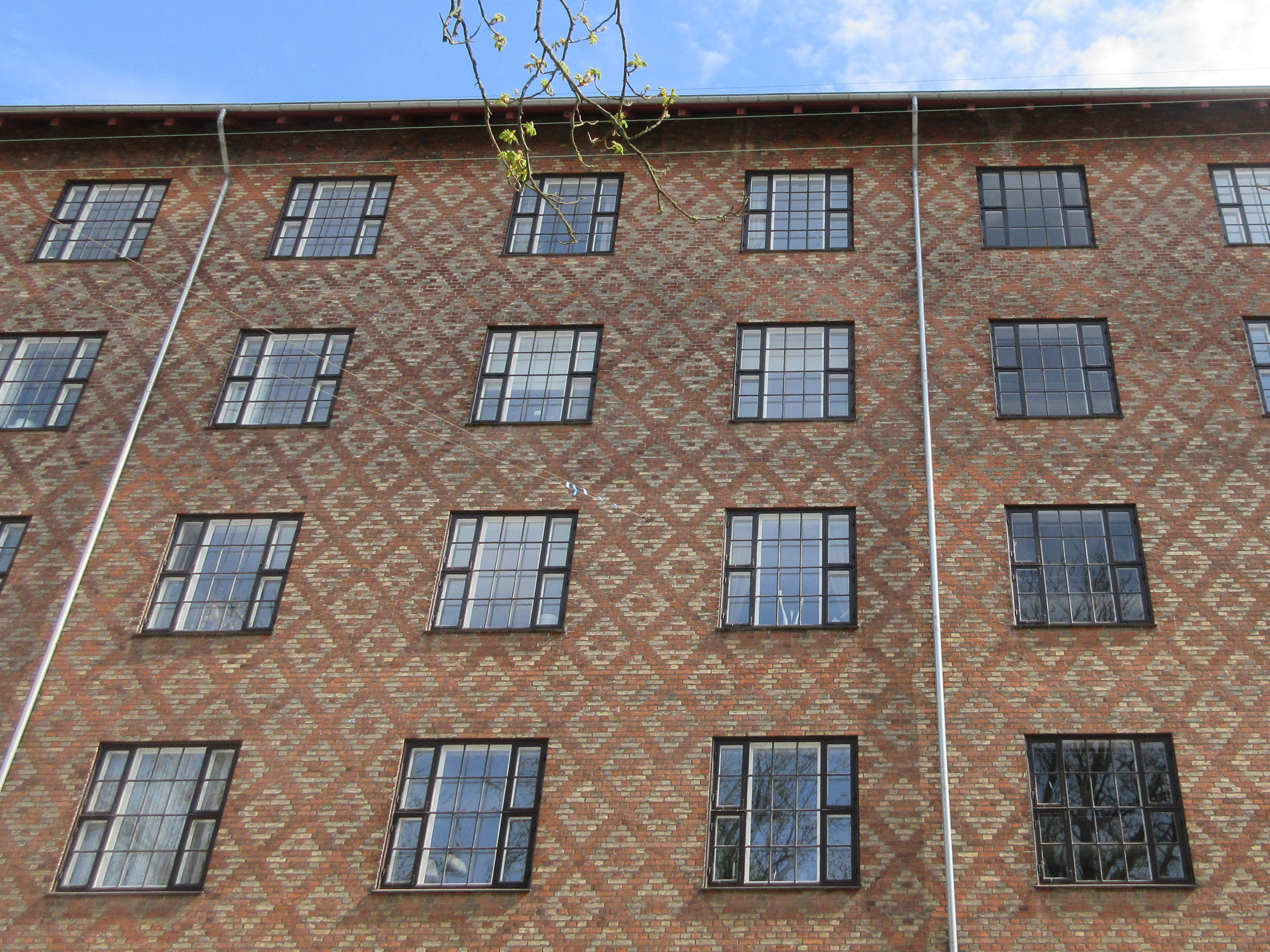
