= Povl Baumann =

Danish architect (1878–1963)

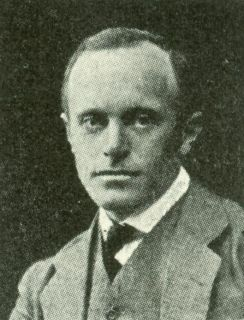
- Born: 9 November 1878; Copenhagen, Denmark
- Died: 3 July 1963 (aged 84); Tibirke, Denmark
- Occupation: Architect

Povl Erik Raimund Baumann (9 November 1878 – 3 July 1963) was a Danish architect who was a central figure during the transition from Neoclassicism to Functionalism in Danish residential architecture. In 1910, he was one of the founders of Den frie Architektforening, an alternative architects' association, and headed it for the nine years it existed.

== Early life and education ==
Baumann was born on 9 November 1878 in Copenhagen, the son of art historian and translator Heinrich Johann Raimund Baumann and Julie Augusta née Riise. His maternal grandfather was pharmacist Albert Heinrich Riise- His maternal uncle was photographer Frederik Riise. Baumann first enrolled at the College of Advanced Technology to become a building engineer but in 1888 discontinued his studies after just three semesters. Instead he took classes at a technical school from 1899 to 1901 while at the same time apprenticing as a mason. He was admitted to the Royal Danish Academy of Fine Arts in 1900 but dissatisfied with the teachings, left just two years later and was instead articled to Peder Vilhelm Jensen-Klint. He participated in an archaeological expedition to Rhodes from 1803 to 1805. He won a scholarship from the Art Academy in 1907.

== Career ==
=== First independent works ===
In 1908 to 1910, he worked in the offices of Jensen-Klint, Axel Preisler, Ulrik Plesner, and professor Heinrich Wenck at the design office of the Danish State Railways from 1908 to 1910. At Jensen-klint's and Wenck's office, he was part of a group of young like-minded architects which also included Ivar Bentsen, Carl Petersen, Hans Koch and Thorkild Henningsen and with whom he founded Den Frie Arkitektforening in 1909.

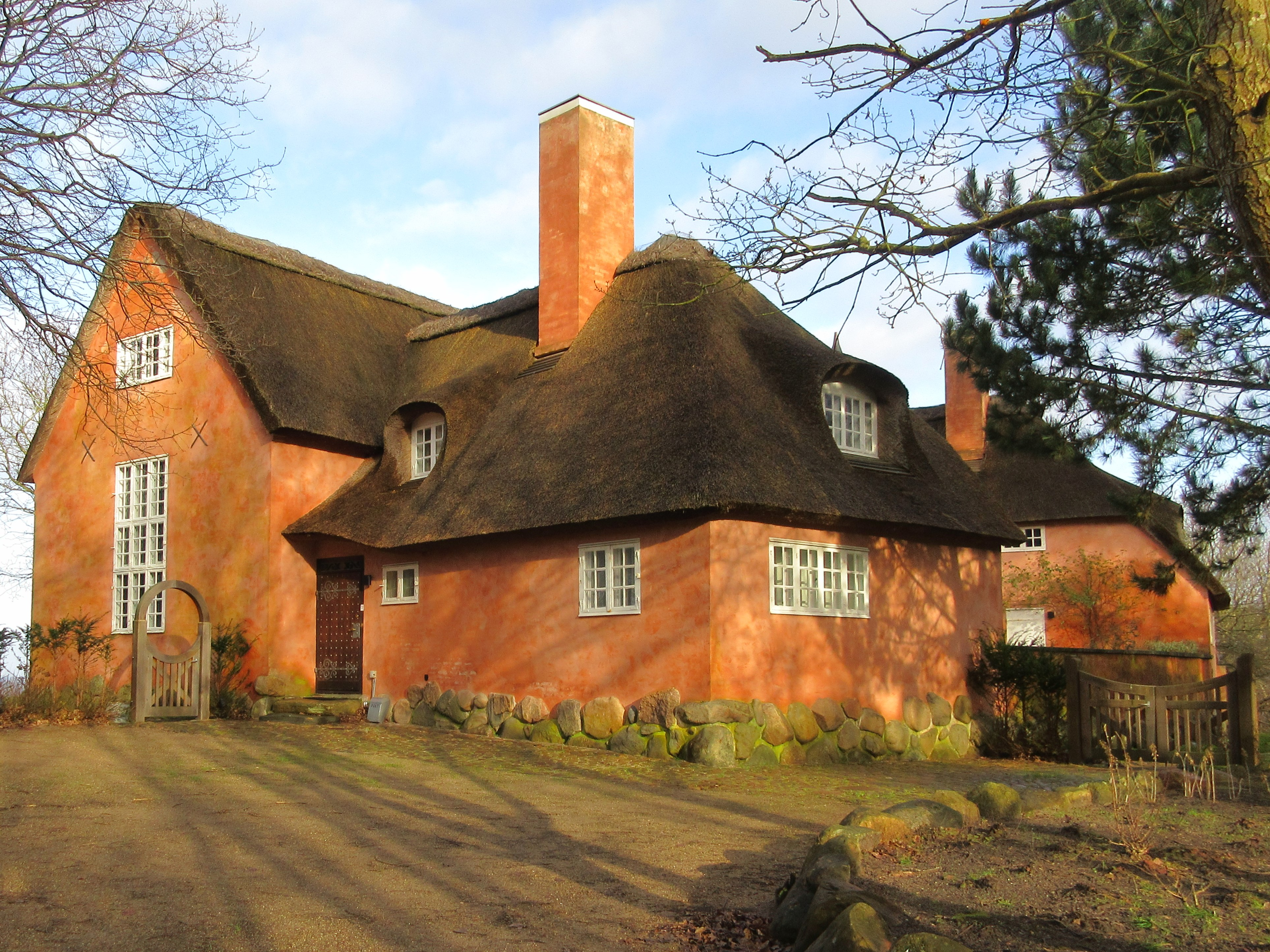
Rågegården, Rågeleje (1015)

Baumann's first independent work was the house Jenle for Jeppe and Nanna Aakjær in 1907–07. His sister knew Nanna Aakjær, through Richardt's Sløid School where they had both worked.

In 1910, Baumann set up his own practice. Over the next years, he designed a number of large villas and country houses, mostly in Copenhagen's affluent northern suburbs or in North Zealand. These included Rågegården in Rågeleje and Mikkelgård in Hørsholm, both of which have been listed in the Danish Registry of Protected Buildings and Places..

Other early works included a church on Saint Croix and a tobacco shop for A.M. Hirschsprung & Sønner.

=== Collaborations and larger commissions ===
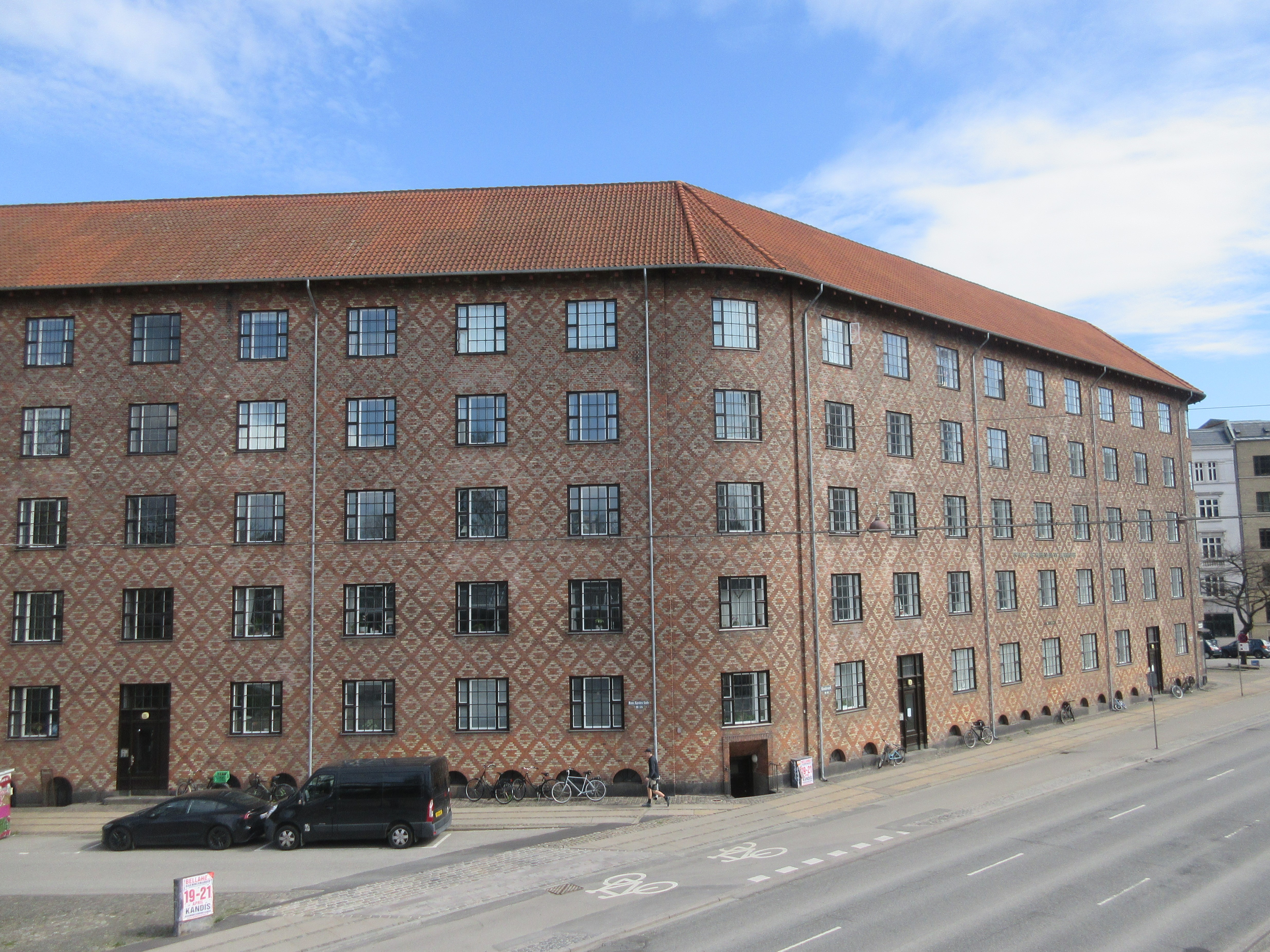
Brick work of the Linoleum House, so nicknamed because the pattern resembles an old-fashioned linoleum floor.

In the late 1910s, Baumann began to receive large commissions which were often created in collaboration with other architects. A housing estate designed in collaboration with Ivar Benzon in 1914 was completed on Vestergårdsvej in 1917. It was followed by an apartment block for Copenhagen Municipality at Struenseegade/Hans Tavsens Gade in 1919–20. Both these buildings received annual awards from the city. They were followed by a number of other housing estates, including Møllegården at Amager Boulevard, Grønnegaarden at Borups Allé, Classens Have on Classensgade and Linoleumshuset in Åboulevard. These early apartment buildings were all designed in the Neoclassical style.

=== 1930s-; Modernist period ===
From around 1930, Baumann's work was increasingly influenced by the Modernist trends of the time, This was for instance the case with the office building Ved Vesterport, designed in collaboration with Ole Falkentorp in 1930–31. Later examples are the housing estates Storgården and Klerkegården on Tomsgårdsvej.

== Personal life ==
Baumann married Elisabeth Christine Roero (1888–1971), a daughter of organist Otto Roerop (1855–1939) and Anna Christine Elisabeth Jensen (1856–1935), on 25 November 1913. They owned a house at Tibirke.

== Selected works ==
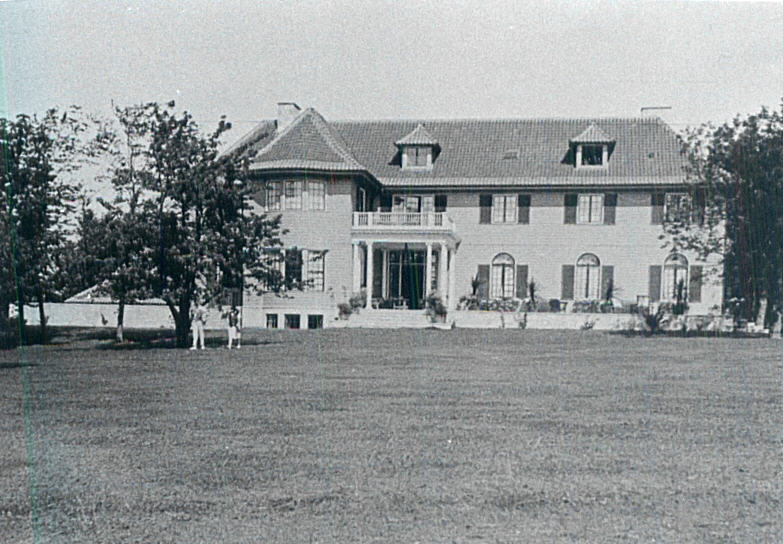
Villa Svastika from 1926

- Church, Saint Croix (1913)
- Classens Have housing (1924, with Carl Petersen and Ole Falkentorp),
- Villa Svastika (later Christianshøj), Strandvejen, Rungsted (1927, garden by G.N. Brandt, demolished 1983)
- Linoleumshuset, Copenhagen (1930–31)
- Ved Vesterport office building (1930–32, with Ole Falkentorp)
- Storgården residential building, Copenhagen (1935, with Knud Hansen)
- Dansk Industri, Copenhagen (1938–39)

== Gallery ==
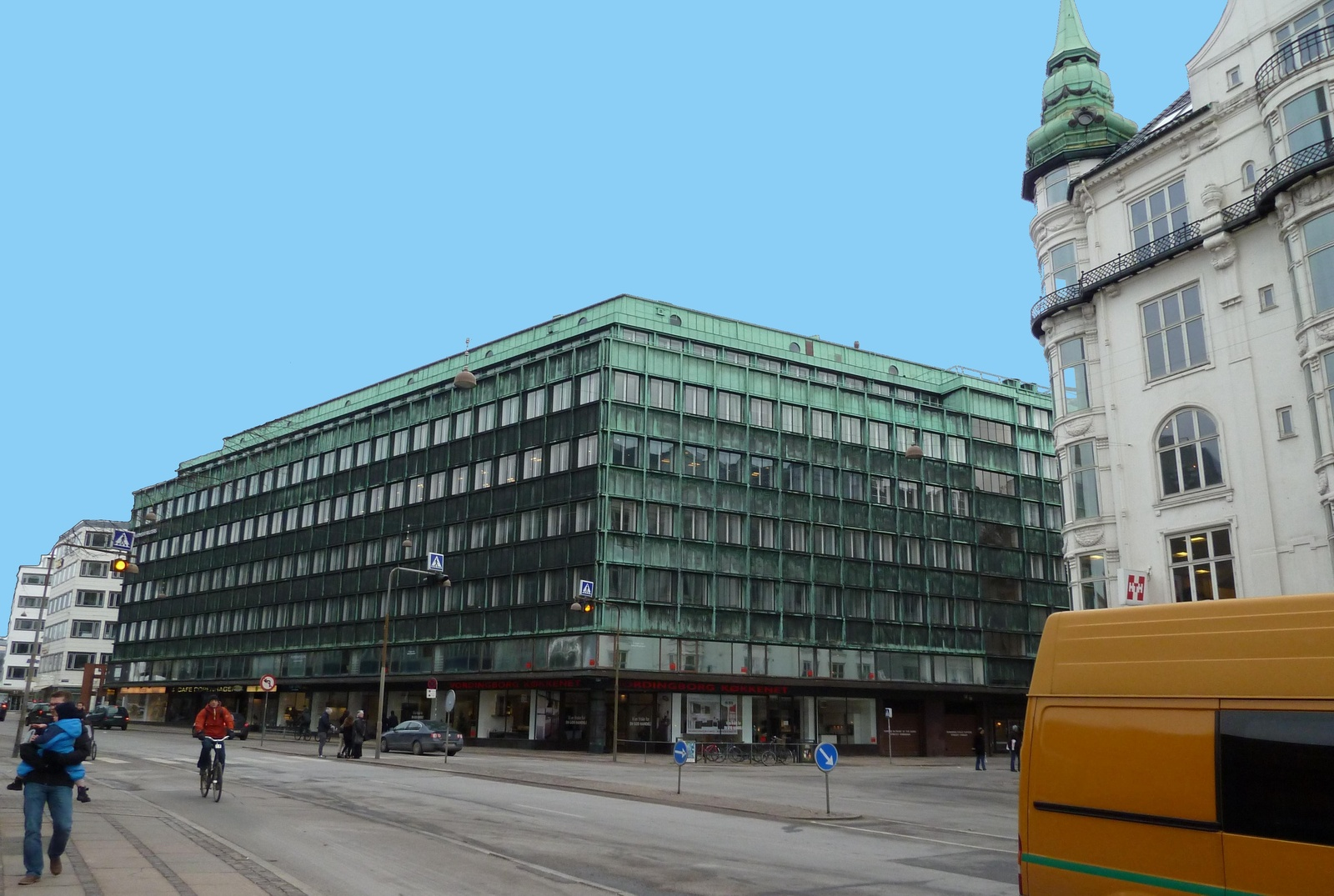
Ved Vesterport, Copenhagen (1930–32)

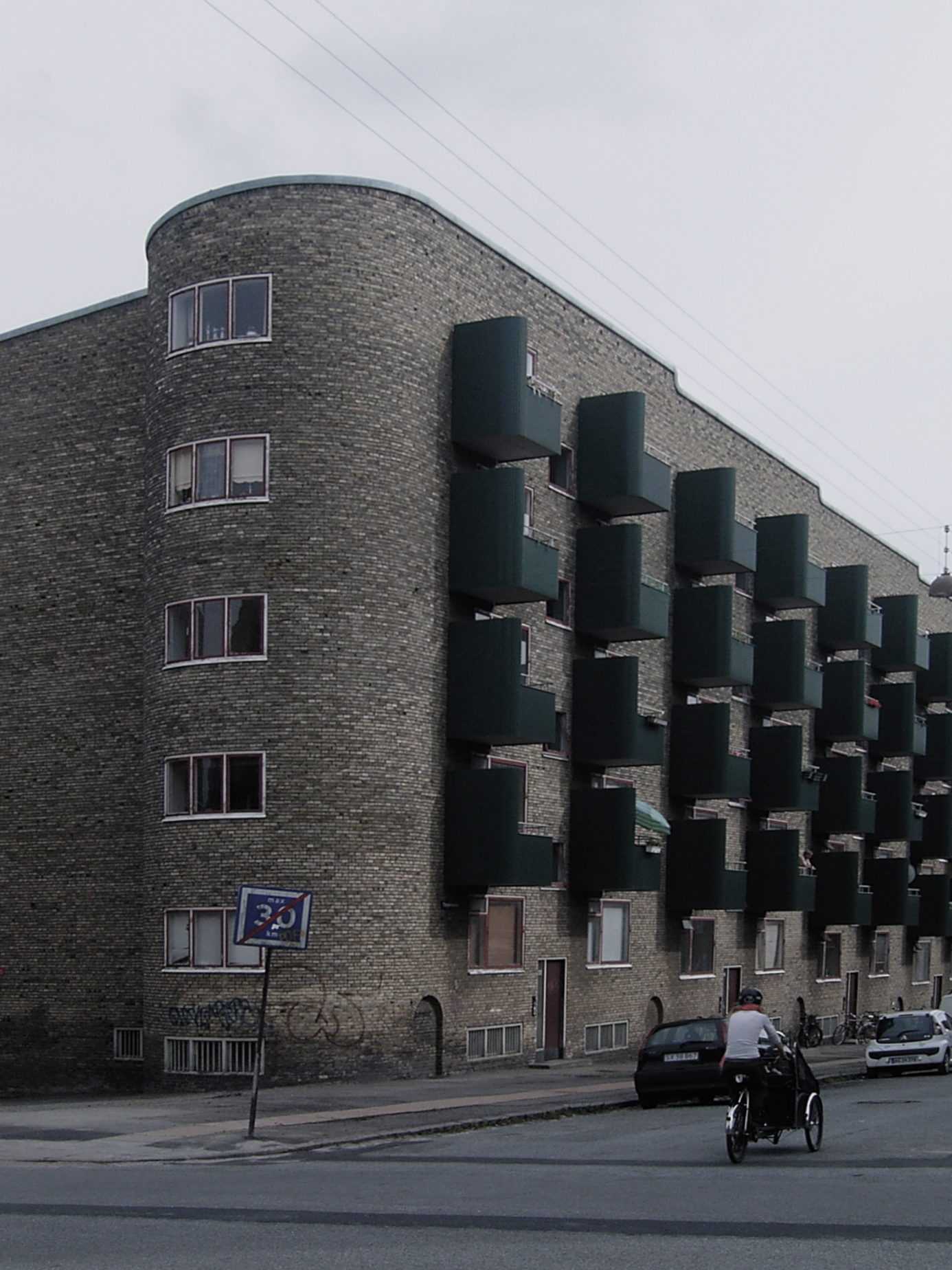
Storgården, Copenhagen (1935)
