= Mikkelborg =

Town in eastern Denmark

Coordinates: 55.911°N 12.522°E

Mikkelborg is a seaside locality in Hørsholm Municipality, located between Rungsted to the south and Kokkedal to the north, some 20 km north of Copenhagen, Denmark. Mikkelborg Strandpark (Mikkelborg Beach Park) is a public park and beach. Mikkelgård, a listed house from 1916 located inside the park, is now operated as a restaurant.

== History ==
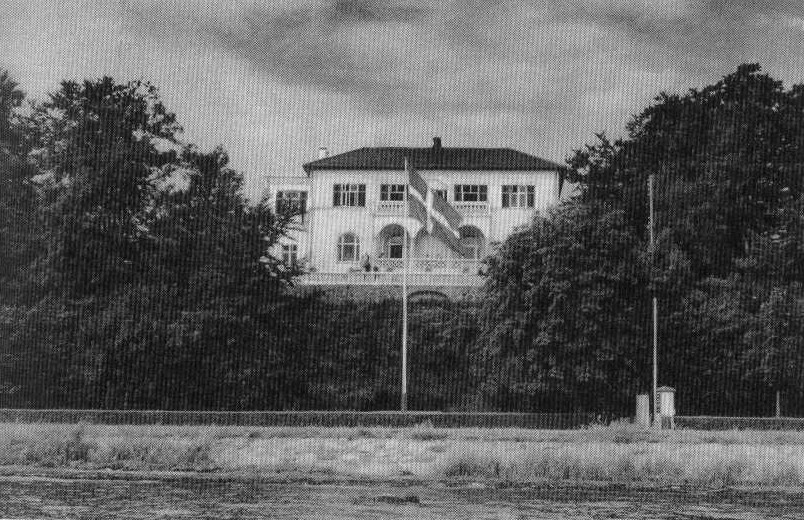
Villa Mikkelborg

The area was built over with large houses in the beginning of the 20th century. Villa Mikkeborg was built in 1900 by a son of Frederik Horsens Block from Kokkedal House. Another house was built by Carlsberg-heir Vagn Jacobsen in 1926.

Later the Danish state began to acquire some of the large houses in the Mikkelborg area with the intention of creating a beach park similar to the one at Bellevue Beach further to the south. The 8-hectares park was protected in 1999. Other houses were purchased by Hørsholm Municipality. They were demolished in the early 1980s to make way for the housing estate Mikkelborg Park. The 8-hectares beach park was protected in 1999.

== Today ==
The heritage listed former country house Mikkelgård is located in the middle of the park. The building is now used as a restaurant and event venue.
