= Scandinavian Academy of Fashion Design =

Fashion design school in Denmark

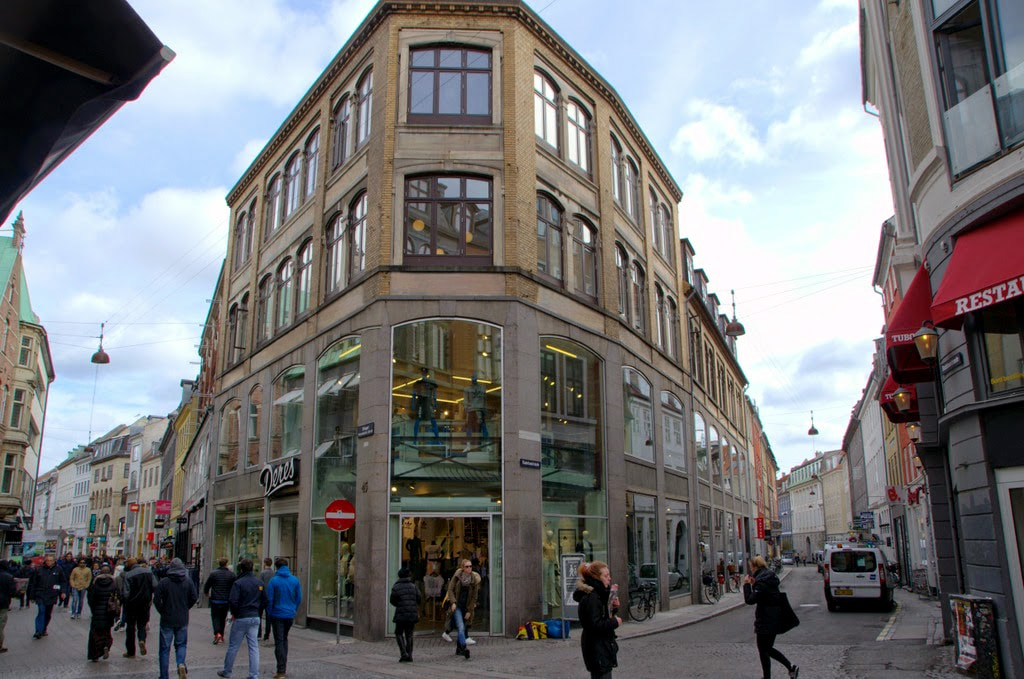
- Former name: Margrethe-Skolen
- Established: 1931
- Affiliations: University of the Arts London
- Head: Christina Beckman
- Location: Copenhagen, Denmark; 55.6791°N 12.5809°E
- Website: safd.dk

Scandinavian Academy of Fashion Design, often abbreviated to SAFD, is a fashion design school in Copenhagen, Denmark. It offers a full-time three-year fashion design education, and a variety of short and summer courses.

It was formerly known as Margrethe-Skolen.

== History ==
The Scandinavian Academy of Fashion Design (former Margrethe-Skolen) was founded by Margrethe Glad in 1931 and is named after the school's patroness Princess Margrethe of Bourbon-Parma. The reason for SAFD's success was partly thanks to Margrethe Glad's effective social network and her travels to Paris. She first went there to renew her wardrobe, returning later to buy models for manufacturing in Copenhagen. In addition, her language knowledge and pedagogical skills helped her along. In the period when the school was established, interest in courses on textiles was high even at the existing schools but SAFD's education in cutting and sewing elegant fashion designs with an international flavor was new Similarly, the study tours to Paris she arranged for the school's students were unusual at the time.

In 1937, Margrethe Glad moved to Frederiksholms Canal, where SAFD was firmly established in the premises near the beach, and the students learned pattern cutting, sewing and draping based on French haute couture tailoring. After a few years, Margrethe Glad retired from the school, and in 1945, SAFD moved to Badstuestræde led by Inga Madsen, who died in 2008. Thereafter Christina Beckman became director of the school. From 1953 the school was located on Østergade, but in 2012 it moved back to larger and newer facilities in Badstuestræde.

The school officially changed its name in 2017 when Margrethe-Skolen became Scandinavian Academy of Fashion Design (SAFD).

Graduates of SAFD have achieved recognition and success both nationally and internationally. Alumni include: Margit Brandt, Henriette Zobel, Susanne Rutzou, Bendikte Utzon, Princess Benedikte, Rene Gurskov, Rikke Ruhwald and Bitte Kai Rand.

Her Royal Highness Princess Benedikte of Denmark has established a fund from which the annual Benedikte Prize is awarded.

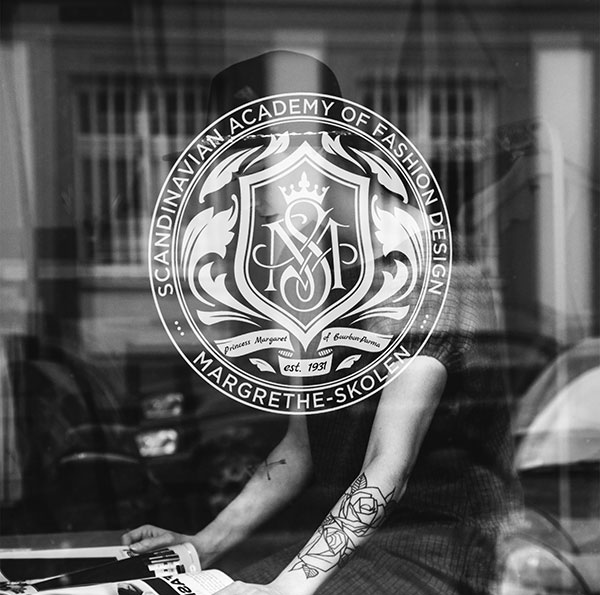
Copenhagen campus, student working

== Networks and partnerships ==
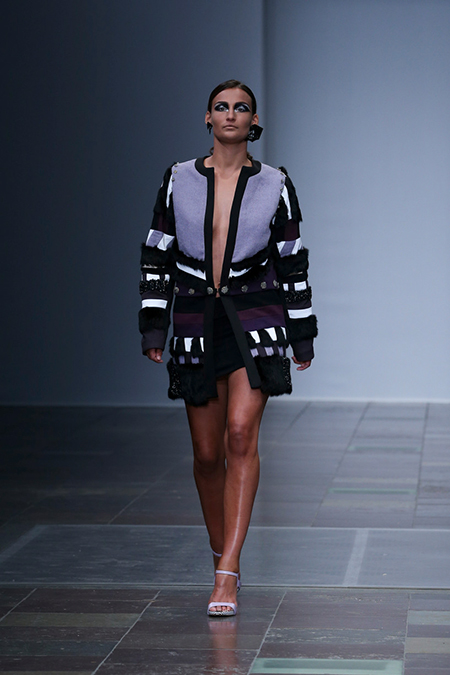
SAFD fashion show during Copenhagen Fashion Week

SAFD is a member of the network organization Danish Fashion Institute, which was founded by and for the Danish fashion industry. SAFD is also a member of Danish Fashion & Textile, known as DM&T.

== Campus ==
The main college building is in Badstuestræde 1, central Copenhagen, Strøget which is the longest pedestrian shopping streets in Europe.

== Alumni ==
Alumni of the college include:

- Margit Brandt, fashion designer
- Susanne Rützou, fashion designer
- Princess Benedikte, Princess of Denmark
- Princess Elisabeth, Princess of Denmark
- Lene Sand, fashion designer
- Benedikte Utzon, fashion designer
