= Store Mariendal =

Country house in Hellerup, Denmark

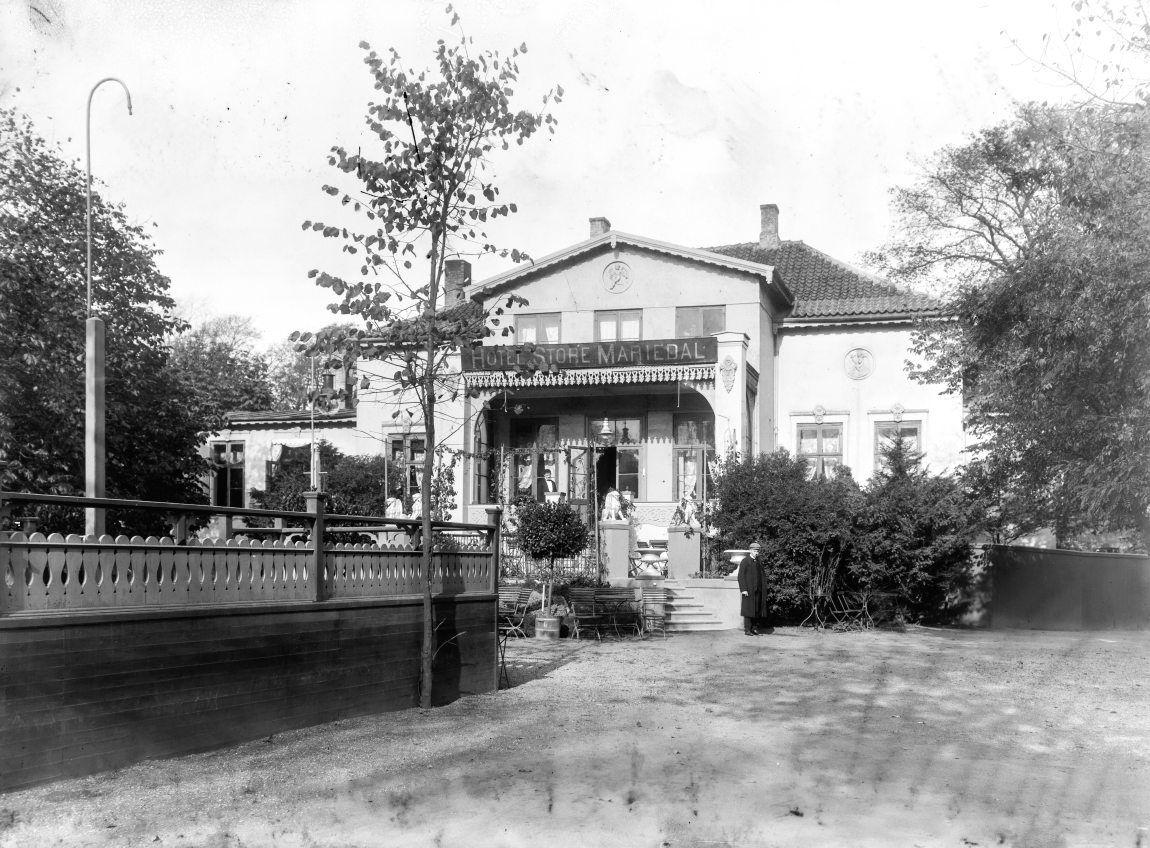
Hotel Store Mariendal in c. 1900

Store Mariendal was a country house at Strandvejen 135 in Hellerup, on the border between Copenhagen and Gentofte municipalities, Copenhagen, Denmark. It was operated as a hotel and entertainment venue in the 1900s and 1910s and served as the residence of Prince Viggo from 1931 to 1970. The building was demolished in 1977 and a housing estate with 121 apartments by the same name is now located at the site.

== History ==
A country house named Lille Lokkerup was located at the site at the beginning of the 18th century. In the late 1720s, Christian Koningh owned it. A later owner, royal mint master Christian Wieneken, renamed it Mariendal after his wife.

The property was in 1757 acquired by Philip de Lange. He demolished the buildings and constructed Store Mariendal on the Copenhagen side of the border in 1759 followed by Lille Mariendal on the Gentofte side of the border in 1764.

Lange made the house available to the Spanish envoy to Copenhagen. After Lange died in 1881, it was sold in auction. The buyer was royal ropemaker Peter Applebye. The next owners were chief secretary F. Chr. Rosenkrantz, bank manager Johan Niklai Tetens, major-general Oxholm and silk merchant and local politician Johan Christian Lund. In 1872 most of the land wassold off in lots. The jurist and credit union manager Ephraim Magdalus Møller purchased Store Mariendal in 1888.

Store Mariendal was acquired by captain Knud Rasmussen in the late 1890s and converted into a hotel, restaurant, and music venue. In 1919, it was acquired by the businessman Carl Glad. He owned the oil company L. C. Glad and was two years later appointed as Austrian consul-general. The main building was adapted by the architect Aage Rafn in 1928.

Glad's company went bankrupt in connection with the great crash of 1929. They had to sell both their properties and moved into an apartment in Bredgade.

The new owner of Store Mariendal was Prince Viggo, Count of Rosenborg, a son of Prince Valdemar of Denmark and Princess Marie Amélie Françoise Hélène d'Orléans, who lived there until his death in 1970. The building was then used as the head office of the engineering company Bigum og Steenfoss.

Store Mariendal was purchased by Lejerbo in 1977 and demolished. In 1970, a housing estate with 121 apartments was completed at the site.
