= Lille Strandstræde 8 =

Listed buildings in Copenhagen, Denmark

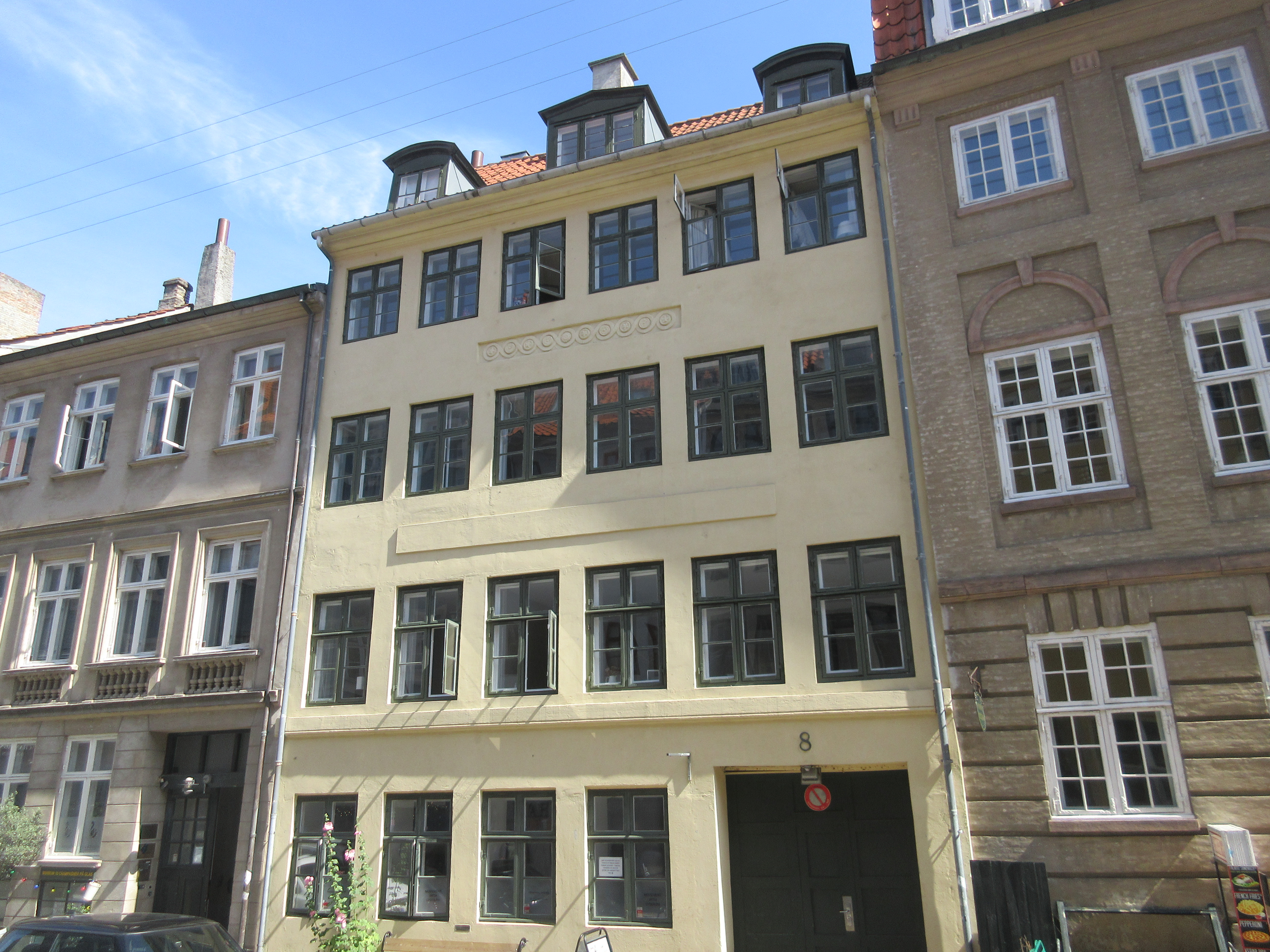
- Lille Strandstræde 8 in August 2024
- Interactive map of the Lille Strandstræde 8 area

General information
- Architectural style: Neoclassical
- Location: Copenhagen, Denmark
- Coordinates: 55°40′50.41″N 12°35′22.85″E
- Completed: 17th century

Lille Strandstræde 8 is an 18th-century property situated around the corner from Nyhavn in central Copenhagen, Denmark. Constructed as a two-storey, half-timbered building for Andreas Bodenhoff in the middle of the century, it was later first reconstructed in brick and heightened with two storeys in 1783 and then, in 1932, expanded with a seven-bays-long side wing on the rear. The building was listed in the Danish registry of protected buildings and places in 1959. Notable former residents include the German painter Bernhard Mohrhagen and the veterinarian Viggo Stockfleth.

== History ==
=== 18th century ===
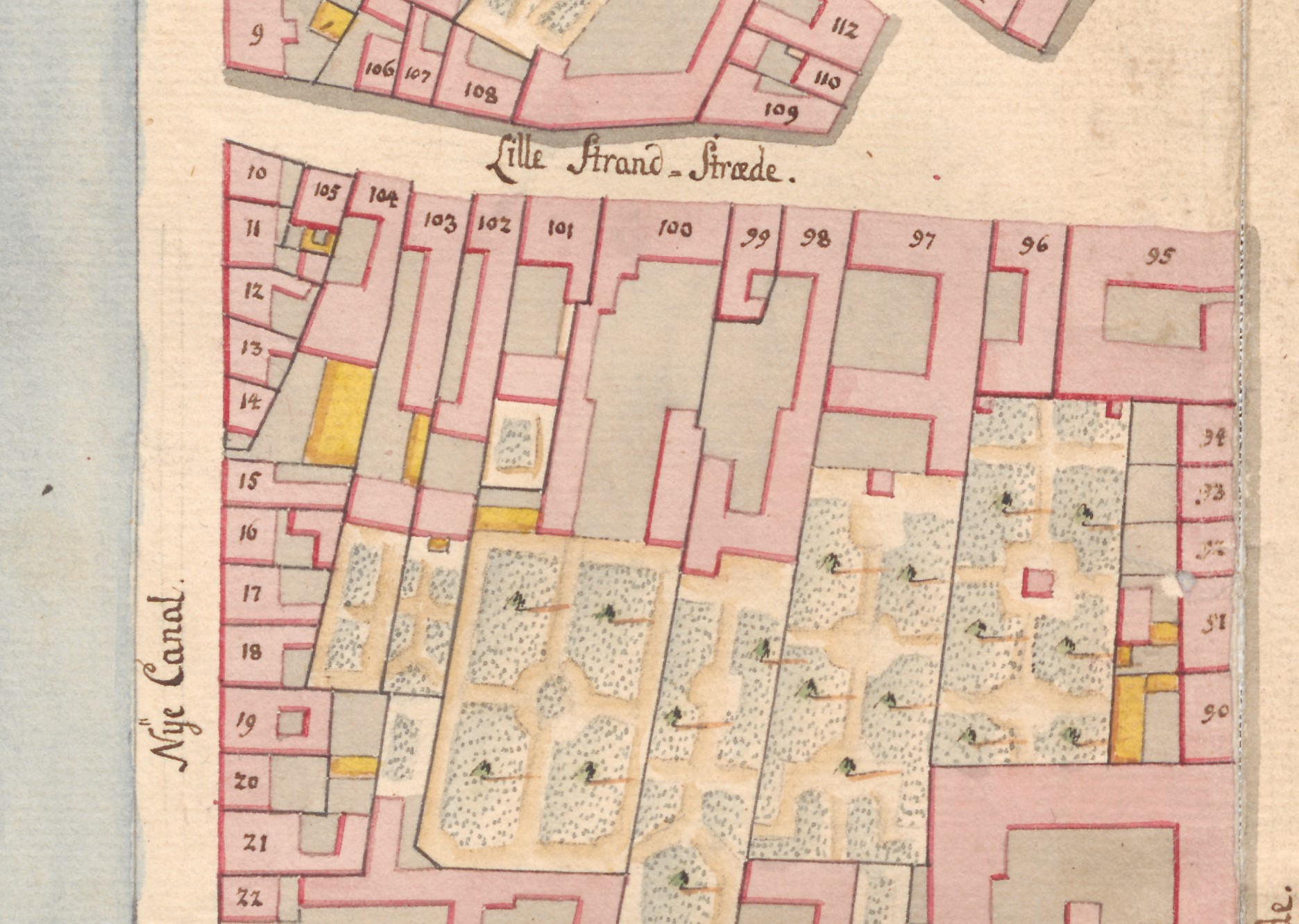
No. 103 seen in a detail from Christian Gedde's map of St. Ann's East Quarter, 1757

The site was formerly part of a much larger property, comprising present-day Lille Strandstræde 8, Nyhavn 41-49 and Toldbodgade 1-3. This large property was listed in Copenhagen's first cadastre of 1689 as No. 28 in St. Ann's East Quarter and belonged to tanner Villum Lydersen at that time.

The property was divided into a number of smaller properties in around 1740. The property now known as Lille Strandstræde 7 belonged to Jacob Lindemann in 1731. The present building on the site was most likely constructed for merchant Andreas Bodenhoff some time before 1757, but then as a two-storey, half-timbered building with a facade crowned by a central gabled wall dormer. The property was listed in the new cadastre of 1756 as No. 103 in St. Ann's East Quarter and now owned by the Garrison Church (then referred to as Herre Zebaoths Kirkes). The church's rectory was located at present-day Store Strandstræde 18. This property continued all the way through the block and its rear side was thus located approximately opposite No. 103 (Lille Strandstræde 8).

=== The distillery ===
The property was later acquired by distiller Eskild Hallesen. The two-storey building was heightened with two storeys in 1786. The exterior walls were at the same time reconstructed in brick on all sides except towards the yard. A communal "quarter well", frequented by residents of the surrounding neighborhood without access to a private well, was located in the courtyard.

Hallesen's property was home to a total of 30 residents in six households at the time of the 1787 census. The owner resided in one of the dwellings with his wife Anna Sophia Datter, their three children (aged one to seven), one male servant and one maid. David Clausen, an instructor in navigation, resided in the building with two sisters and one maid. Valentin Koye, a retired army major, resided in the building with two unmarried daughters and one maid. Hans Degn, a ship captain, resided in the building with his wife Maren. Johan Frederik Keyser, registered as a pennesnider, resided in the building with his wife Rebecca, their three children (aged two to five), two male servants and one maid. Hans And Gastner, a workman at the Glass Company, resided in the building with his wife Elsabeth, their two daughters (aged three and eight) and one lodger.

The property was home to 35 residents in eight households at the 1801 census. Niels Sørensen, a new distiller, resided in the building with his wife Margrethe Nielsdatter, three servants and two lodgers. Anders Munck, a skipper, resided in the building with his wife Johanne Larsdatter, their two-year-old son, a 26-year-old relative, one maid and one lodger. Jacob Hendrup, a merchant, resided in the building with his wife Johanne Cathrine Hendrup and their 14-year-old son. Christen Mottela Lamotte, a ship cook, resided in the building with his wife Charlotte Mottela and their two daughters (aged six and 11). Margrethe Hartman, a widow, resided in the building alone. Moens Berskow, a carpenter, resided in the building with his wife Cathrine Persdatter and their 17-year-old son. Peder Jensen, a watchman, resided in the building with his wife Ane Margrethe Jensen and their four children (aged two to seven). Thomas Persen, a carpenter, resided in the building with his wife Mette Pedersen and three lodgers (sailors).

The property was listed in the new cadastre of 1806 as No. 71. It was owned by distiller Johannes C. Katterup at that time.

=== 1834 census ===
The property was expanded with a seven-bays-long side wing and a rear wing in 1932. The number of residents had therefore increased to 76 residents in 17 households at the 1834 census. The property was now no longer owned by distillers, and the distillery had closed. Frederik Michael Rasmussen, a grocer (høker), reided on the ground floor of the front wing with his wife Marie Bonnier, their three children (aged two to six) and one maid. Johan Frederik Hoch (1771-1839), the local rodemester, resided on the first floor with his wife Andrea Sophie Klingenberg (1774-1838) and two unmarried daughters (aged 18 and 32). Dorthe Rosenbeck, a widow who supplemented her pension from the Royal Danish Mail with needlework, resided on the second floor with her sister Henriette Blok, her niece Charlotte Magrethe Blok and one lodger. The lodger was the German portrait painter Bernhard Mohrhagen, who studied under Louis Gurlitt at the Royal Danish Academy of Fine Arts from 1830 to 1832. Heinrich Christian Stokflett, a master goldsmith, resided on the third floor with his wife Anne Lovise Clausen, their seven children (aged two to 19) and two lodgers. Their son Harald Viggo Stockfleth would later become a professor at the Royal Danish Veterinary and Agricultural College. The remaining tenants, who either lived in the side wing or the rear wing, were mostly workmen or craftsmen. Only one of the craftsmen, Marthin Oppermann, a master goldsmith, was a master craftsman. He resided on the third floor of the rear wing with his wife Frederikke Kirstine Bøyesen.

=== 1840 census ===
The property was home to a total of 66 residents at the 1840 census. Hans Peter Larsen, a new grocer (høker), was now residing on the ground floor of the main wing with his wife Bolette Magrethe Simonsen and their four children (aged five to 10). Most of the other residents were again craftsmen, workmen or widows (mostly employed with needlework).

=== 1850 census ===
The property was home to 70 residents at the 1850 census. Jesper Sørensen, a new grocer, resided on the ground floor with his wife Kirsten Sørensen and their three children (aged eight to 20). Peter Petersen, a pensioner, resided on the first floor with his wife Hanne født Hansteen, their nine-year-old son Peter Melius Petersen and the lodger Christopher Grönvold (student). Thyge Clausen, superintendent of a public bath house (baemester), resided on the second floor with his wife Kirstine Clausen and their five children (aged 0 to eight). Frederik Ferdinand Seerup, a lackey at the queen dowager's court, resided on the third floor with his wife Mari Margrethe (née Hansen).

=== 1860 census ===
The property was home to 57 residents in 17 households at the time of the 1860 census. Thyge Clausen, a new grocer (høker), resided on the ground floor with his wife Karen Christine Clausen (née Gjerløv) and their three children (aged 11 to 19). Lars Andersen, a skipper, resided on the first floor with his wife Karen Andreasdøbert Andersen and one maid. Christine Elisabeth Holst, an unmarried woman catering to diners, resided on the second floor with her assistant Johann Gottlieb Haiser.

=== 1880 census ===
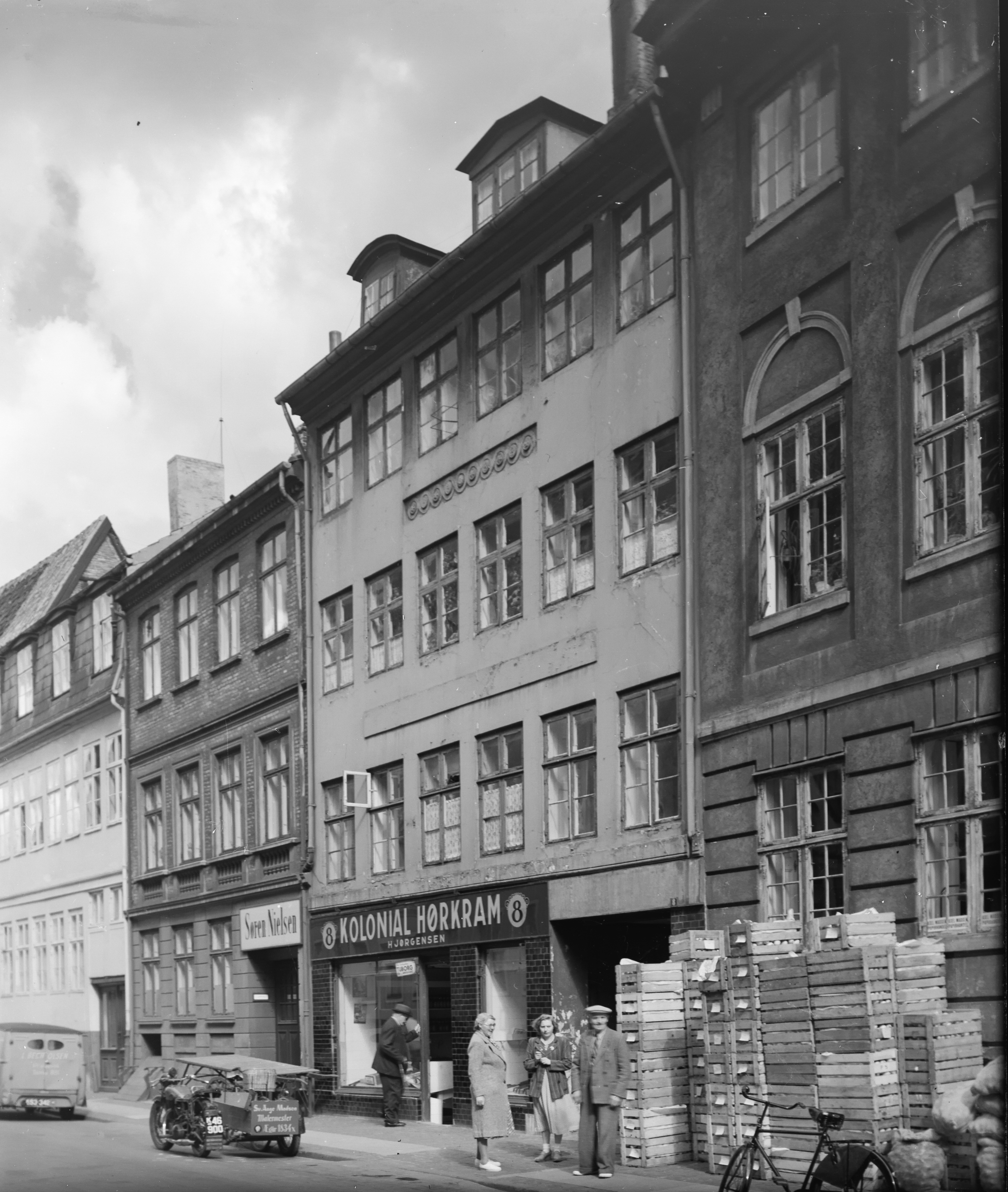
Lille Strandstræde 8 with the grocery shop, photographed by Mogens Galk-Sørensen, c. 1949

The property was home to a total of 36 residents at the 1880 census. Lauritz Christian Larsen, a retailer, shopkeeper, resided on the ground floor with his wife Emilie Frederikke Larsen, their two children (aged two and 12) and one maid. Hanne Petersen (née Hanckeen), a widow who ran a boarding home on the second and third floor, resided on the first floor with one maid. Jens Christian Jensen, a sail maker, resided on the first floor of the side wing with his wife Albertine Svendsen and their two-year-old son Sophus Chr. Aage Jensen. Carl Christian Sørensen, a workman, was also resident on the first floor of the side wing. Ludvig Clausen, a joiner, resided on the second floor of the side wing with his wife Chatrine Augustine Clausen and their 20-year-old daughter Hulda Elonora Clausen. Emil Bonde, a retired sculptor, resided on the second floor. Frederik Jacobsen, a carriage builder, resided on the ground floor of the rear wing with his wife Kirsten Jacobsen and their 19-year-old foster daughter Marie Dorthea Henriette Jørgensen. Lauritz August Rasmussen, a smith, resided on the first floor of the rear wing with his wife Birthe Sophie Rasmussen and their six-year-old foster daughter Marie Hasine Nielsen. Christian Herman Edvard Jørgensen, a workman, resided on the second floor of the rear wing with his wife Camilla Angelika Christiane Jørgensen. Rasmus Larsen, a fireman, resided on the third floor of the rear wing with his brother (haulier), his sister-in-law Husmoder and their nine-year-old son Anna Sophie Larsen.

=== 20th century ===
The property belonged to ship chandler Søren Sørensen Houberg (1866-) in 0+9. Lille Strandstræde 7 on the other side of the street was also owned by him.

== Architecture ==
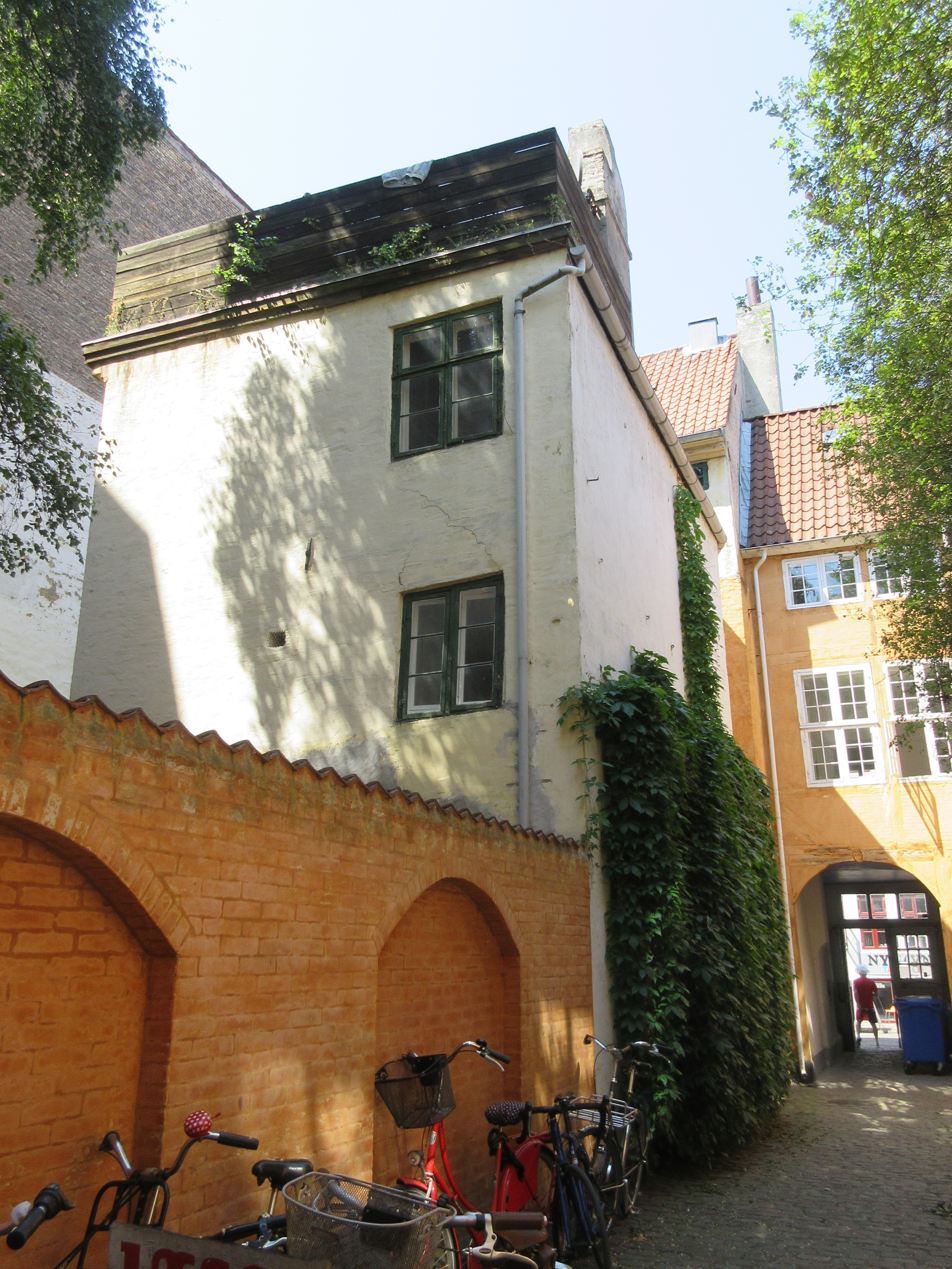
The side wing of Lille Strandstræde 8, viewed from the courtyard of Lille Strandstræde 10

Lille Strandstræde 8 is four storeys tall and six bays wide. Its facade is plastered and painted in a pale yellow colour, with green-painted window frames and a green-painted gate in the bay furthest to the right. It is finished with a belt course above the ground floor and a simple cornice below the roof. The only other decorative elements are a slightly depressed blank frieze above the four central windows of the first floor and another one with rosette ornamentation above the two central windows of the second floor. The pitched tile roof features three dormer windows towards the street. The roof ridge is pierced by a chimney. A seven-bays-long side wing extends from the rear side of the building along one side of the courtyard. It is integrated with the front wing by a canted corner bay. The rear wing has been demolished. The old "quarter well" is still seen in the courtyard but it is now sealed.

== Today ==
Lille Strandstræde 8 is now divided into condominiums. The property is jointly owned by their owners via E/F Lille Strandstræde 8.
