= Nyhavn 27 =

Historic building in Copenhagen

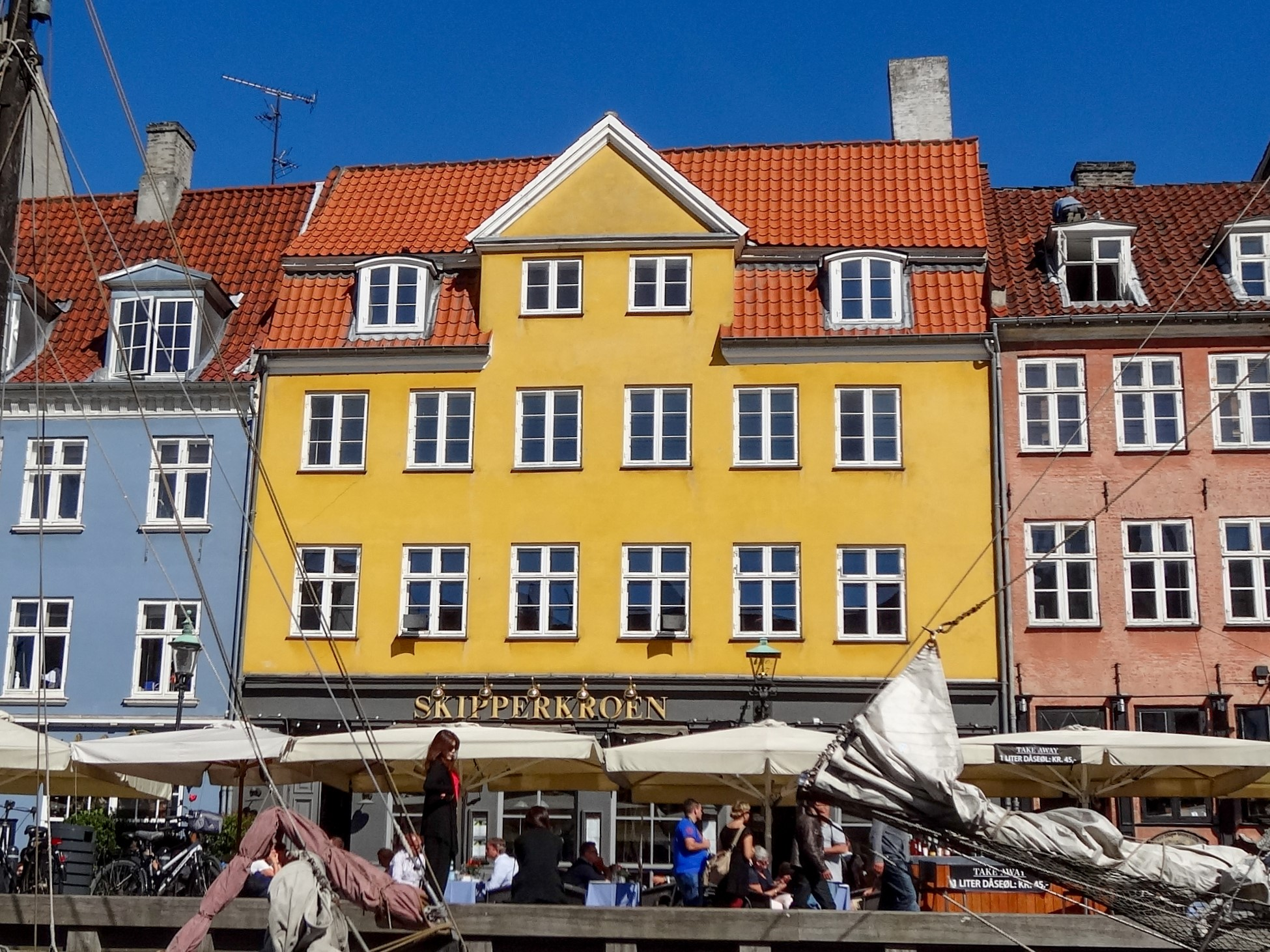
- Nyhavn 27 seen from the other side of the canal
- Interactive map of the Nyhavn 27 area

General information
- Location: Copenhagen, Denmark, Denmark
- Coordinates: 55°40′49.12″N 12°35′23.64″E
- Completed: 18th century

Nyhavn 27 is an 18th-century property overlooking the Nyhavn Canal in central Copenhagen, Denmark. The building was listed in the Danish registry of protected buildings and places in 1945. In the 18th century, it was for a while owned by the timber merchant Andreas Bodenhoff. The building was later operated as a hotel under the name Stadt Flensburg.

== History ==
=== Early history ===
In the late 17th century, Nyhavn 17–27 was one large property. It was listed in Copenhagen's first cadastre of 1689 as no. 9 in St. Ann's East Quarter (Sankt Annæ Øster Kvarter), owned by stonemason Hans Friedrich. The property was later divided into a number of smaller properties. A building was constructed on the site before 1738. In the middle of the century, the property now known as Nyhavn 27 belonged to Vartov Hospital.

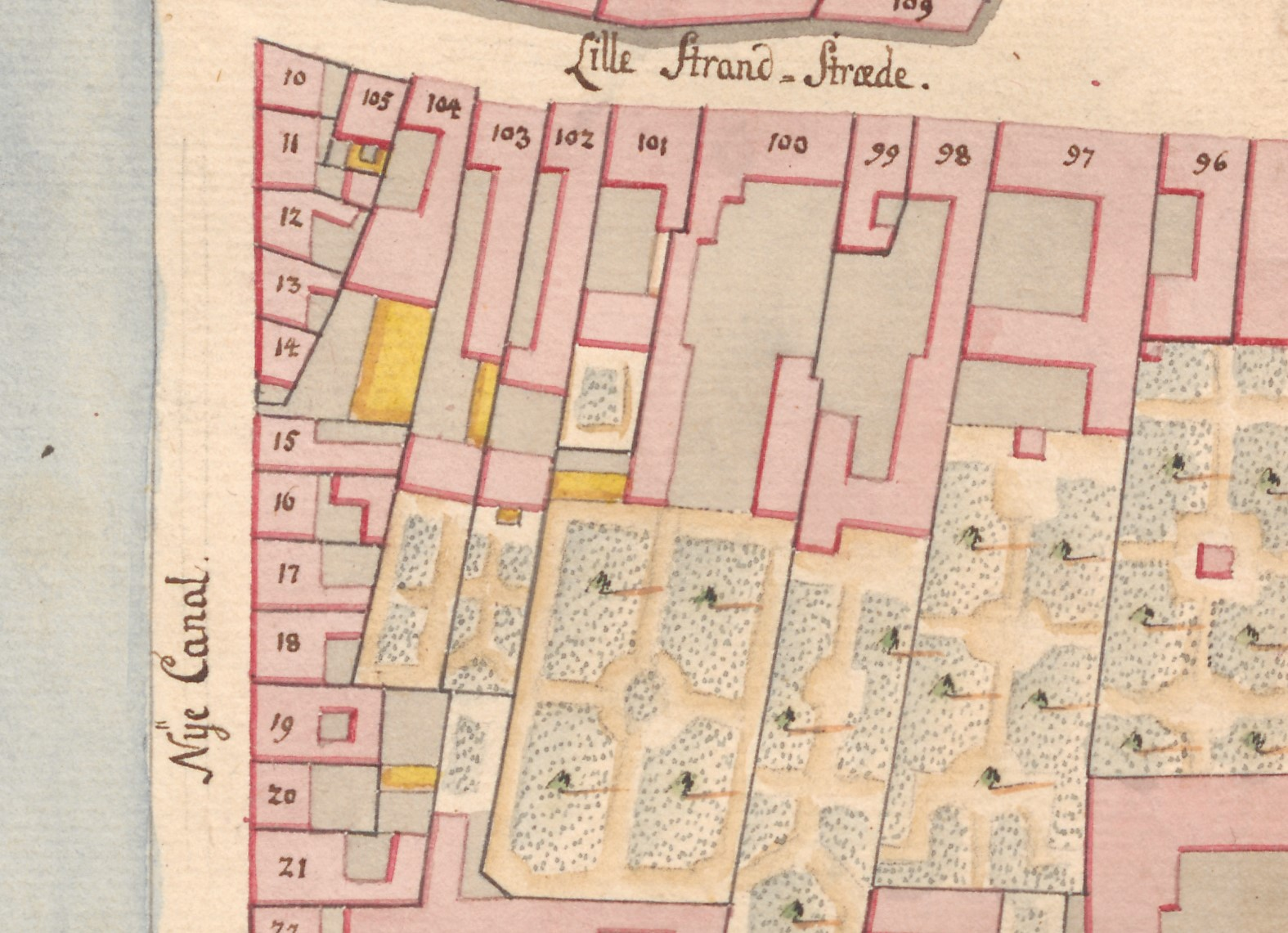
No. 14 seen in a detail from Christian Gedde's map of St. Ann's East Quarter, 1757

In 1753, Vartov Hospital sold the property for 1,500 Danish rigsdaler to Andreas Bodenhoff. He had previously owned a property in Store Strandstræde. His property was listed in the new cadastre of 1756 as No. 14 in St. Ann's East Quarter. In 1761, Bodenhoff purchased a property on the other side of the Nyhavn Canal (now Nyhavn 12) from one Peter Løy's widow. On 25 June 1761, he sold his old property (Nyhavn 27) to her.

The property was at some point acquired by merchant Mads Mortensen. At the time of the 1787 census, Mortensen resided in the building with his wife Charlotte Amalia Mortensen, his niece Anna Margrethe Lange, an office clerk, a 16-year-old apprentice and a caretaker.

=== 1800–1849s ===
The property was by 1801 owned by merchant Jens Johansen. He resided in the building with three employees in his grocery business (one fuldmægtig and two with title of kontorbetjent), a housekeeper, the housekeeper's 10-year-old son, a maid and a caretaker.

In the new cadastre of 1806, the property was again listed as No. 14 in St. Ann's East Quarter. It belonged to N. A. Aggersborg at that time.

No. 14 was home to three households at the time of the 1834 census. Christian Bistrup, a barkeeper, resided in the associated dwelling with his wife Magrethe Brandt, two boys (aged 13 and 14) and two maids. Andreas Brandt, a merchant, resided on the first floor with his wife Hellene Brandt, their two children (aged seven and nine), a female lodger and a maid. Lars Madsen, a grocer (spækhøker), resided in the basement with his wife Mette Olsdatter, their three children (aged 10 to 15), a maid and six lodgers.

The property was only home to two households at the 1840 census. Frederik Nelsen, a new restaurateur, resided on the ground floor with his wife Ane Kirstine Solberg, their three children (aged one to 10), a pastry baker (conditorsvend) and two maids. Lauritz Aabye Johnsen, an Aarhus-based merchant who operated a boat service between his home town and Copenhagen, resided on the first floor with his two children (aged four and 10), a housekeeper and a lodger.

=== Hotel Stadt Flensborg ===
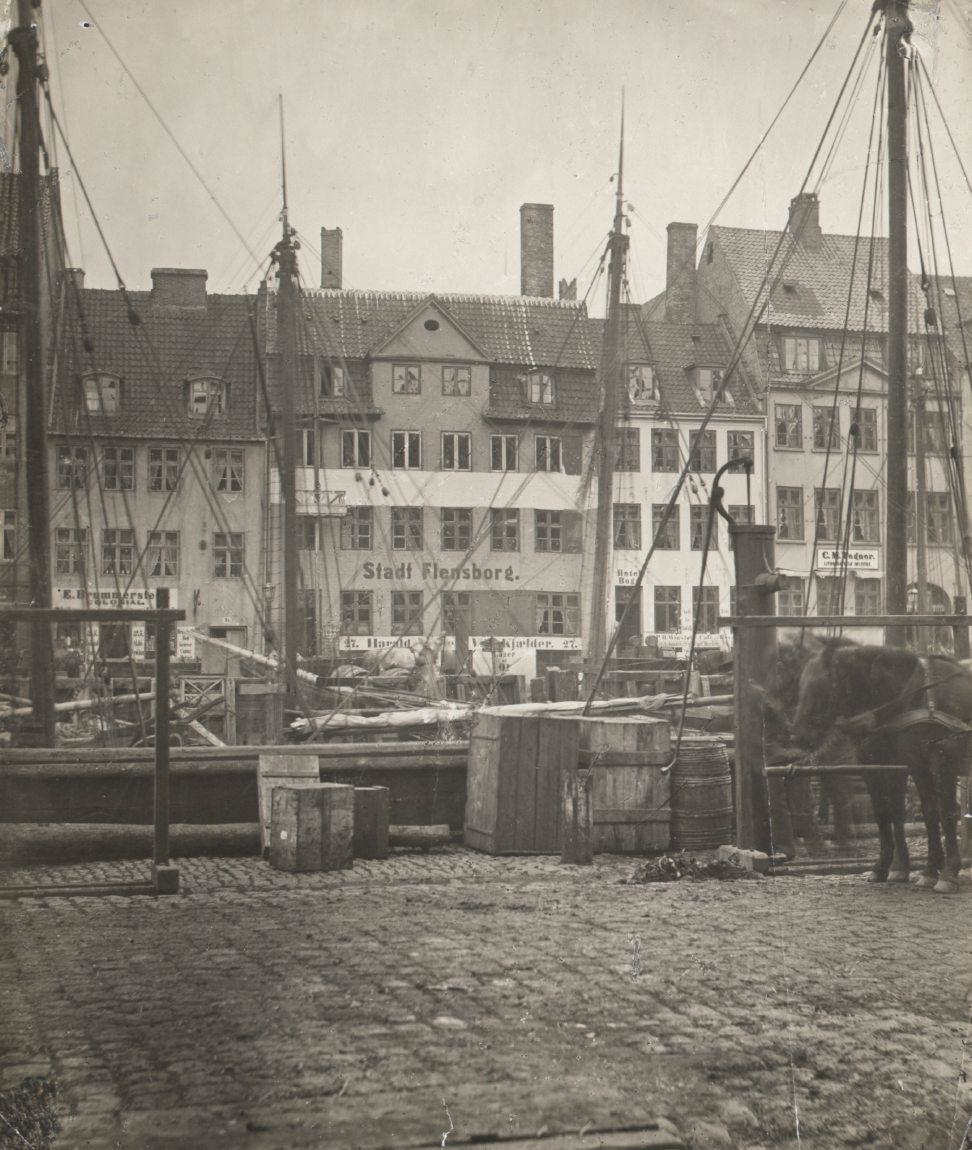
Nyhavn 27, seen between two ship masts with the name "Stadt Flensborg" on the facade on a photograph from the 1870s

The property was later converted into a hotel under the name Stadt Flensburg by Frederik Nielsen. His property was home to two households at the time of the 1850 census. Nielsen resided on the ground floor with his wife Ana Kirstine Solberg, their five children (aged five to 20) and one housekeeper (husjomfru). Carl Ferdinand Berner, a grocer (urtelræmmer), resided in the basement with his apprentice Peter Theodor Wunstedt.

The property was again home to two households at the 1860 census. Frederik and Anne Kirstine Nielsen resided in the building with theirthree children (aged 15 to 17), a housekeeper and a maid. Frederik Jean Harald Jørgensen, a new grocer (urtelræmmer) resided on the ground floor with his wife Kirstine Marie Emilie Jørgensen (née Borggren), a floor clerk and a male servant.

The property was home to 37 residents at the 1880 census. Carl Johan Pellerson, a new hotelier, resided on the ground floor with his wife Marie Pellerson, his three lodgers (aged five to nine), three maids, a lodger and nine sailors (hotel guests). Christian August Bjering, a textile merchant (klædekræmmer), resided on the first and second floors with his wife Mine Magrete Bjering, their five children (aged one to seven), two maids, two lodgers and a female floor clerk (employee). Carl Christian Sieweike, a master tailor, resided in the basement with his wife Anna, their four children (aged nine to 20) and a 12-year-old apprentice.

Stadt Flensburg was located in the building until at least the 1870s. The bar on the ground floor is supposedly the oldest in Nyhavn. It has been operated under a number of different names, including Cafe Bulbjærg and Cafe Shanghai. It is now called Skipperkroen.

== Architecture ==
Nyhavn 27 was constructed as a two-storey, four bays wide building between 1724 and 1738. The facade towards the canal was built in brick while the other sides were constructed with timber framing. This building was in 1784 heightened by one floor as well as a mansard roof with a two-bay wall dormer. The building was between 1784 and 1789 lengthened by two bays, a side wing and a warehouse were constructed on the rear, and the facade towards the courtyard was partly rebuilt in brick. A two and a half bay gateway from 1784 was removed in 1842. Pilasters and a cornice between the ground floor and first floor were added in 1877.

The building was listed in the Danish registry of protected buildings and places in 1945.
