= Kronprinsessegade 34 =

Building in Copenhagen

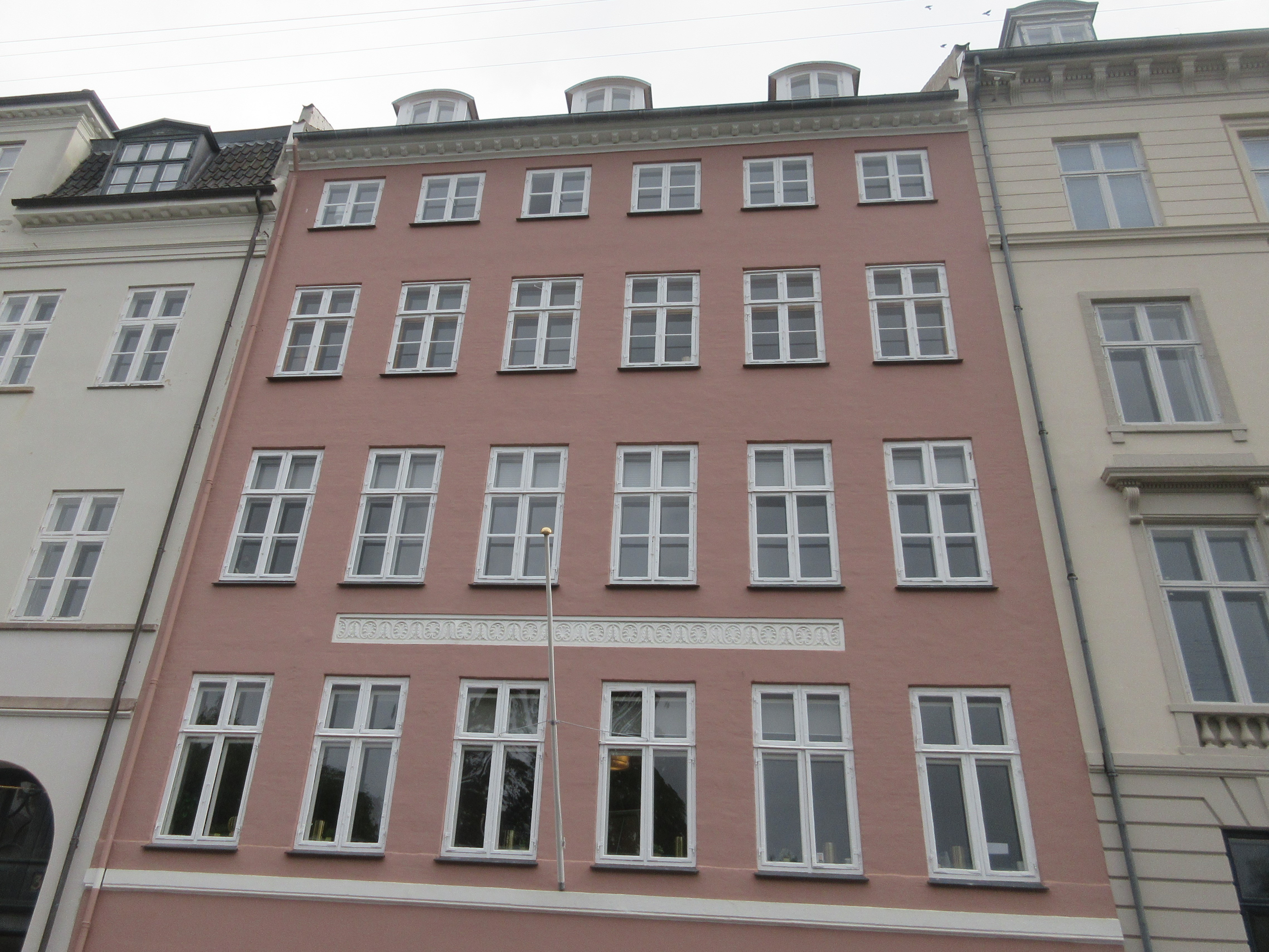
- Interactive map of the Kronprinsessegade 34 area

General information
- Location: Copenhagen, Denmark
- Coordinates: 55°41′4.25″N 12°34′56.89″E
- Completed: 1806

Kronprinsessegade 34 is a Neoclassical property overlooking Rosenborg Castle Garden in central Copenhagen, Denmark. It was listed on the Danish registry of protected buildings and places in 1945. Notable former residents include the writer Henrik Hertz and educator Athalia Schwartz.

== History ==
=== Early history ===
Kronprinsessegade 34 was built by Carl Maij in 1805-1806: The property was listed in the new cadastre of 1806 as No. 398 in St. Ann's West Quarter.

=== 1810–1830 ===
The naval officer Bernhard Ulrich Middelboe (1768–1825) resided in one of the apartments at the time of his death in 1825.

=== 1834 census ===
Magdalene Middelboe (née Foersom, 1772–1861), widow of the naval officer Bernhard Ulrik Middelboe (1768–1825), resided on the fourth floor at the 1834 census. She lived there with two sons, three daughters and one maid.

=== 1840 census ===
Henrich Christian Krag, a retired General War Commissioner, resided on the ground floor at the 1840 census. He lived there with three unmarried daughters (aged 19 to 38) and two maids. Jacob Hansen Thygesen, a royal cook, resided on the first floor with his wife Johanne Marie Thygesen, their six children (aged five to 17) and the lodger Jørgen Kühl (renteskriver in Generaltoldkammeret). Peter Holm, a first lieutenant in the Royal Danish Navy, resided on the third floor with his wife Caroline Marie Holm and one maid. Holger Schestedt, a first lieutenant in the King's Regiment, resided on the fourth floor with his wife Christiane Emilie Schestedt, their three children (aged one to four), one lodger and two maids.

Johan Christian Mølsted, a ropemaker (rebmagersvend), resided on the first floor of the side wing with his 10-year-old son Christian Edvard Mølsted, his mother-in-law Christine Bache and his sister-in-law Andrea Bache. Evald Steffensen, a glovemaker, resided on the second floor of the side wing with his wife Colette Dorothea Steffensen and aunt Maren Just. Peter Emil Offenhausen, a grocer (irtekræmmer), resided on the third floor of the side wing with his wife Christine Lovise Offenhausen. Fred. Vilh. Goth. Due, a tailor, resided in the garret of the side wing with his wife Cathrine Due, their two children (aged one and two), his brother Jens Lauritz Due (tailor) and two lodgers.

=== 1841–1900 ===
The writer Henrik Hertz (1798–1870) lived in the building from 1843 to 1849

The property was home to nine households at the 1845 census. Henrik Stampe, Baron of Stampenborg, had his winter home on the ground floor. He lived there with his wife Christine Stampe (née Dalgas), their three children (aged 12 to 24), one male servant, three maids, a female cook and 26-year-old Henrik Steffens (possibly a relative of the philosopher Henrik Steffens). Frederikke Würtz, a widow, resided on the first floor with two children from her second marriage (last name Würtz, aged nine and 10), two children from her first marriage (last name Schubart, aged 21 and 23 and one maid. B.A.Dantzer, another widow, resided on the second floor with her two children (aged 35 and 26), one maid and the lodger Holger Fangel. A.D.Wilster, another widow, resided on the third floor with the widow S.M.Thorsen, S.M.Thorsen's 13-year-old daughter Mathilde Thorsen and one maid. Peter Hasselquist, a customs official, resided on the fourth floor with his wife Sophie Wodach, their son N. P. Hasselquist (theologian) and one maid. Johann Adolf Møller, a brick-layer, resided in the garret with his wife Jacobine Møller and mother Berthe Marie Møller. Jens Christian Ravn, a watchman, resided on the first floor of the rear wing with his wife Karen Ravn and one lodger. Johanne Marie Falsløv, a widow glovemaker, resided on the second floor of the rear wing with her daughter Johanne Falsløv, 15-year-old Emilie Petrine Meyer, firewood inspector (Favnsætter) Peter Mortensen, Mortensen's wife Inger Marie Jensen and their 10-year-old son Jens Lauritz Mortensen. Peter Emil Offenhausen, a grocer (urtekræmmer), resided on the third floor of the rear wing with his wife Helene Lovise Hjelmstad.

The writer and educator Athalia Schwartz (1821–1871) was a resident in 1856.

=== 20th century ===
The property was home to 26 residents in five households at the 1906 census. Hans Peter Clausen, a hauler, resided in the building with his wife Vilhelmine Clausen and their three sons. Ole Baden (1859–1936), owner of a book printing and book binding business, resided in the building with his Valborg Frederikke Badenm their six children, a maid, a temporary housekeeper and a nurse. Mischella Toxværd, a widow, resided in the building with two lodgers. Tage Hiort, a clerk, resided in the building with his wife Pegga Hiort and one maid. Adelaide Jantzen, Ida Westermann and Emil Aaby—three relatives (probably to the building's owner)—resided in the last apartment.

Ole Baden's company was also based in the building. In 1916, he ceded it to his eldest som Niels Baden (1894-. In 1917, Niels Baden moved it to new premises at Lille Strandstræde 10 . Grann & Laglye, a silver factory founded by Johannes Grann (1885–1945) and Jean Laglye (born 1878) in 1906, was in 1950 based in the building.

Grann & Laglye, a manufacturer of silver products founded in 1906 by Johannes Grann (1885–1945) and Jean Laglye (1878-, was later based in the building.

== Architecture ==
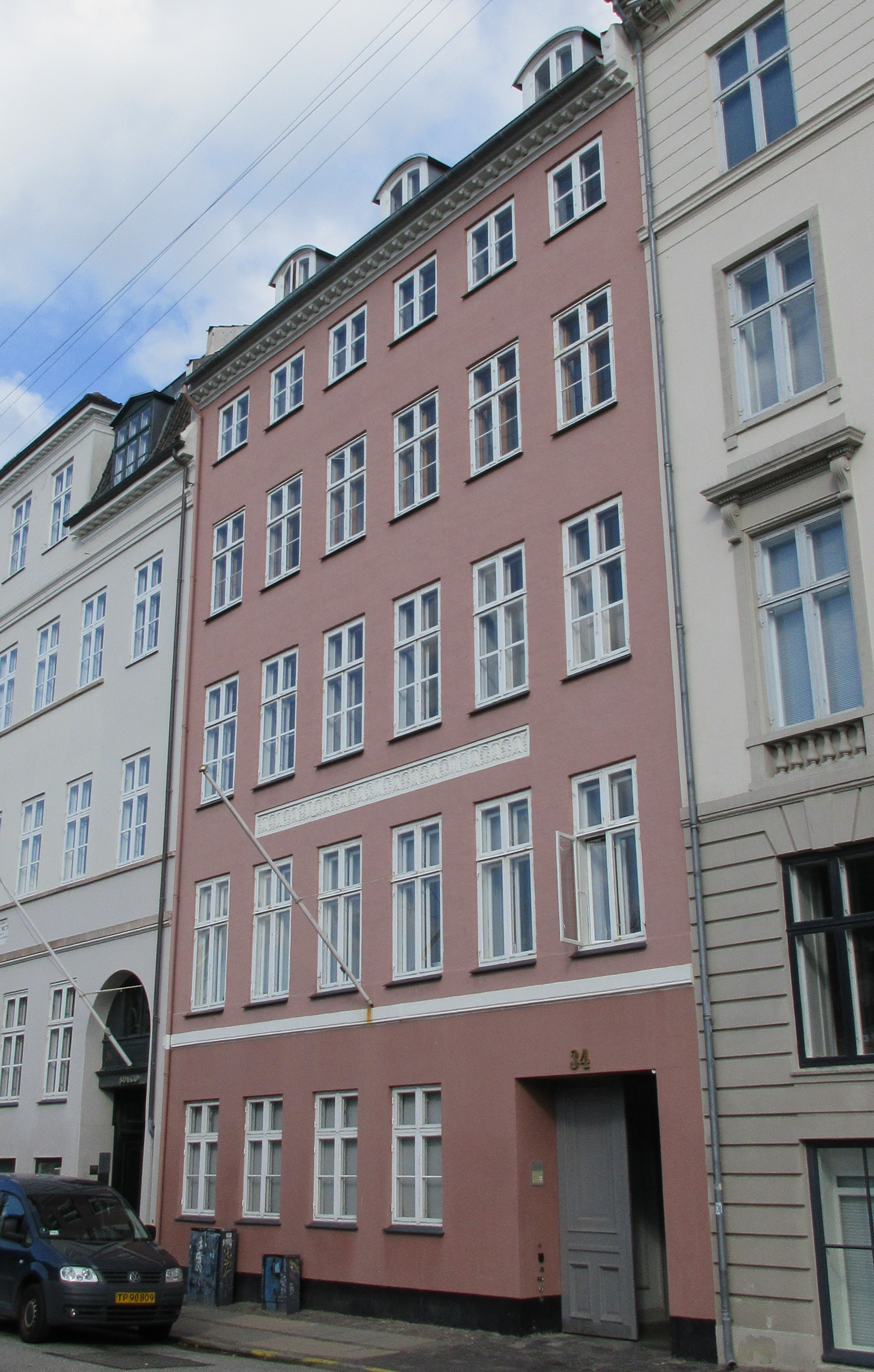
Kronprinsessegade 34.

The building is five storeys tall and six bays wide. A four-bay frieze is located between the second and third floor and under the roof is a cornice supported by brackets. A short side wing projects from the rear side of the building. It consists of two full bays and a canted bay towards the main wing.

== Today ==
The building contains a combination of residential apartments and offices. Current residents include the Svend Toxværd silversmithy and Donsmark Process Technology.
