= Frieboeshvile =

Building in Copenhagen, Denmark

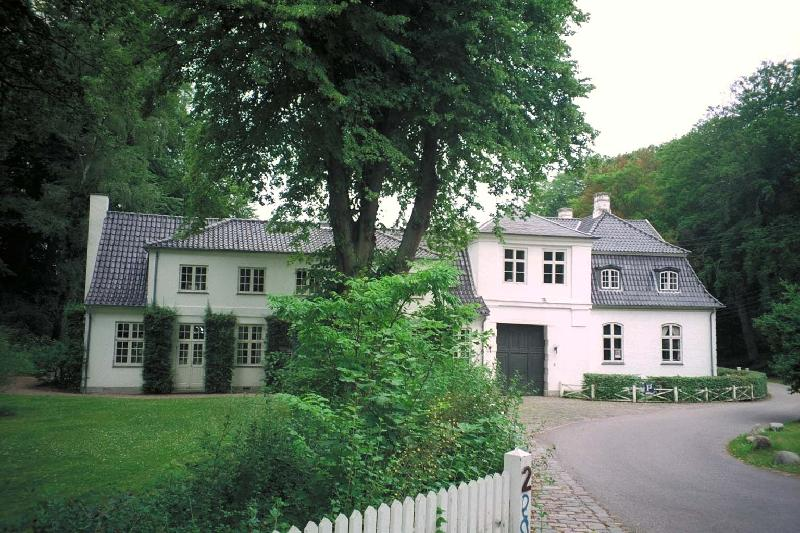
- Frieboeshvile viewed from across the street
- Interactive map of the Frieboeshvile area

General information
- Architectural style: Neoclassicism
- Location: Kongens Lyngby, Copenhagen, Denmark
- Coordinates: 55.7765°N 12.4958°E
- Construction started: 1756
- Completed: 1758
- Client: August Günther

Frieboeshvile (lit. 'Friboe's Resting Place') is a Baroque-style country house in Kongens Lyngby north of Copenhagen, Denmark. It is located across the street from Sorgenfri Palace, where Lyngby Main Street meets Lyngby Kongevej. The house takes its name after Frederik Casper Conrad Frieboe who is buried in the grounds together with his wife and a few other family members. Its most notable former resident is Georg Ferdinand Duckwitz who played an important part in the Rescue of the Danish Jews during World War II.

The house now serves as a historic house museum showing how Copenhagen peers decorated their country homes in the late 18th century. It hosts a permanent and special exhibitions about local history as well as the local historic archives for Lyngby-Taarbæk Municipality.

== History ==
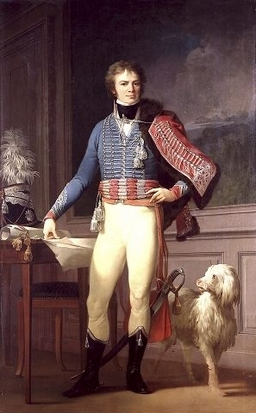
F. C. C. Frieboe from whom the house now takes its name

The house was built from 1756 to 1758 owned by August Günther, a chemist from Copenhagen, and was originally known as Vildnisset (en. The Wilderness). The architect is not known. In 1782 the property was acquired by the wealthy shipping agent Andreas Bodenhoff. His daughter Gjertrud Cathrine inherited it in 1794 and after she married rittmeister and later General Frederik Caspar Conrad Frieboe, it was passed on to him.

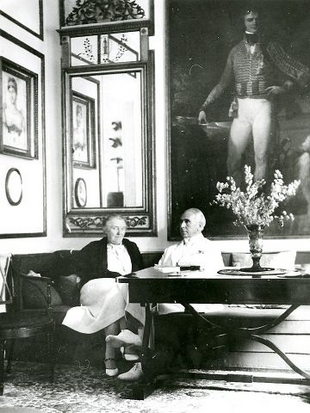
Georg and Agnete Bruhn

Frieboe had no legitimate children. His testament gave the house its current name and converted the estate into Denmark's smallest fideicommissum. The next resident was his sister's son, Lieutenant Colonel F. C. C. Funch. In 1919 the house came into ordinary ownership when the Lensafløsningsloven Act dissolved all Fideicommia. On the same occasion, the house was listed in 1919. The last member of the Funch family to live in the house was Agnete Bruhn, F.C.C. Funch's daughter. Her husband was Georg Bruhn who worked for Bank of Denmark.

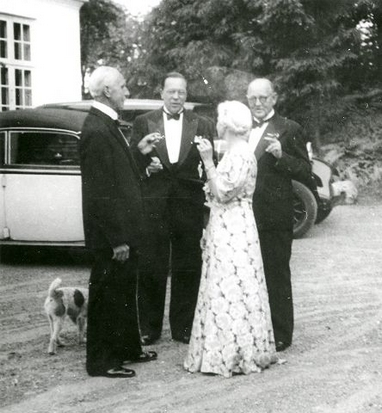
Georg Bruhn (left) and Georg Ferdinand Duckwitz /middle( viewed on the yard in front of Frieboeshvile in 1947

Frieboueshvile's stables, on the side wing, was converted in 1923 into a separate residence and rented out. In 1941, during the German Occupation of Denmark in World War II, it was rented out to Georg Ferdinand Duckwitz. On 18 August 1943, Frieboeshvile played host to a meeting between Werner Best and the Danish politicians Hans Hedtoft, H. C. Hansen and Alsing Andersen. Duckwitz served as West Germany's Ambassador to Denmark after the war.

Following her husband's death, Agnete Bruhn sold the property to Lyngby-Taarbæk Municipality in 1953 but continued to live there until 1968.

== Architecture ==
Built in the Baroque style, Frieboeshvile is constructed in brick with white dressing and details in sandstone. It consists of a single storey topped by a black-glazed mansard roof. The roof is not part of the original building but was added in 1977 when the house was restored. The original roof was clad in wooden roof shingles which in 1867 were replaced with slate shingles. The renovation also restored the Neoclassical interiors which date from Friboe's period of ownership. August Günther's initials are found above the main entrance as well as on the first floor.

== Park ==
Apart from the burial site of General Frieboe and his family, the park also contains a few other features from his day. These include a grotto which originally afforded access to a now collapsed fruit cellar and an aviary converted into a pavilion.

== Exhibitions ==
Frieboeshvile today serves as a historic house museum showing how the Copenhagen bourgeoisie of the late 18th century decorated their country houses where they would reside throughout the summer. The furniture in the house dates from about 1800.

The house also contains a permanent exhibition from the Lyngby-Taarbæk and plays host to two special exhibitions a year on local historic subjects.

== Local historic archive ==
The local historic archive for Lyngby-Taarbæk Municipality is also based at the house. In the reading room it is possible to study old photographs, maps and historic documents from the area.
