= Nyhavn 12 =

Building in Copenhagen, Denmark

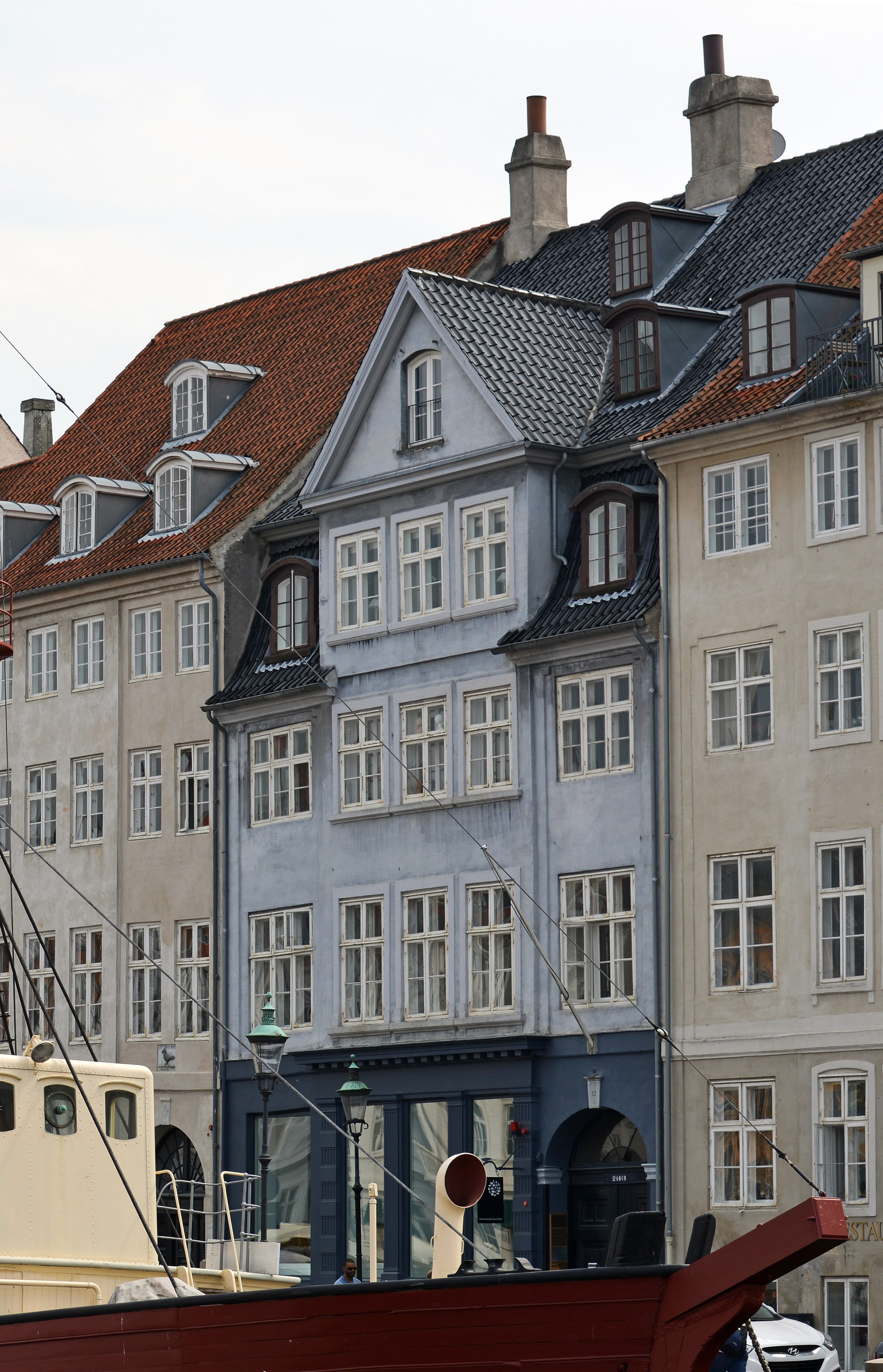
- Nyhavn 12 seen from the other side of the canal
- Interactive map of the Nyhavn 12 area

General information
- Location: Copenhagen, Denmark, Denmark
- Coordinates: 55°40′47.01″N 12°35′23.15″E
- Completed: 1700

Nyhavn 12 is a listed property overlooking the Nyhavn canal in central Copenhagen, Denmark.

== History ==
=== 17th and 18th centuries ===
The site was originally part of Ulrik Frederik Gyldenløve's large property at the corner of Kongens Nytorv and Nyhavn. In Copenhagen's first cadastre from 1689 it was listed as No. 54 in St. Ann's East Quarter.

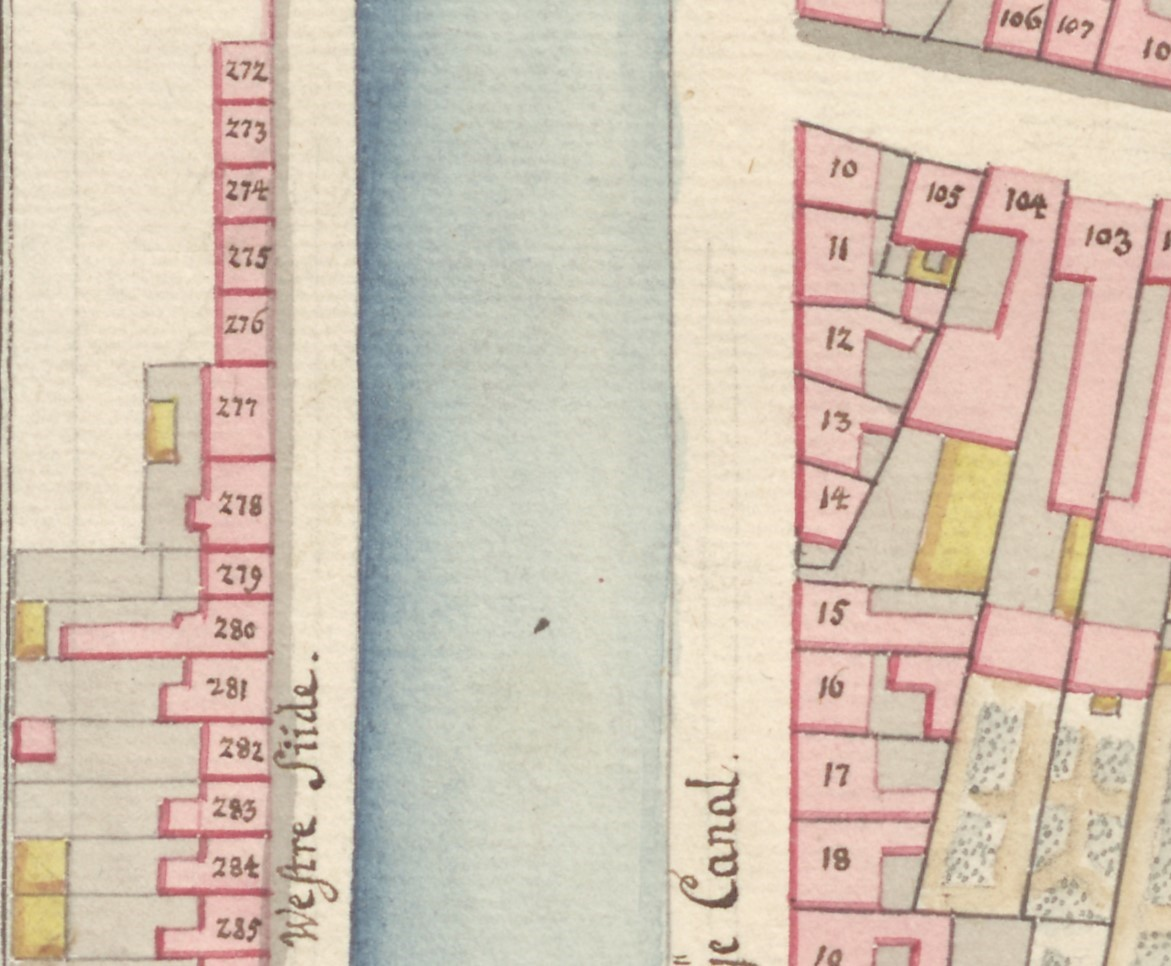
No. 276 seen in a detail from Christian Gedde's map of St. Ann's East Quarter, 1757

A row of small houses along the canal were later turned into separate properties. The property now known as Nyhavn 8 was listed in the new cadastre of 1756 as No. 276 in St. Ann's East Quarter. Together with some of the adjacent houses it was used as residences for staff at the botanical gardens. which were then situated at the northern end of Amaliegade (cf. Amaliegade 45).

Nyhavn 12 was built circa 1770 for merchant and shipowner Andreas Bodenhoff.

=== 19th century ===
The property was listed in the new cadastre of 1806 as No. 276 in Eastern Quarter. It belonged to wholesaler (grosserer) Johan Gerhardt Müllerat that time.

The economist Oluf Christian Olufsen (1764–1827) was a resident in the building in 1809–1810. He worked for Det Classenske Fideicommis and became a professor at the University of Copenhagen in 1815. The deaf-mute painter Andreas Herman Hunæus lived in the building from 1857 to 1863.

The building was listed by the Danish Heritage Agency in the Danish national registry of protected buildings in 1918. The registration was expanded in 2000.

=== 1880 census ===
The property was home to 13 residents at the 1880 census.

Bernhard Frichling, bank manager of Landmandsbanken, resided on the second floor with his wife Anna Marie Frichling, their two children (aged 14 and 18) and two maids. Georgine Dorothea Duncklau, a shop manager, resided on the ground floor. Henrik Johansen, a chairman (formand), resided on the first floor of the side wing with his wife Margrethe Johansen (née Madsen) and their eight-year-old son. A coachman and two servants resided on the first floor of the rear wing.

=== 20th century ===
The property was acquired by Holmegaard Glass Factory in 1913 (or possibly earlier). The company was from then on headquartered in the building. The company operated a retail outlet on the ground floor from 1918 to 1973.

== Architecture ==
The building is six bays wide and has a mansard roof with a large wall dormer. A 13-bay side wing extends from the rear side of the building.

== Today ==
The florist Port Nouveau – Erik Buch is located on the ground floor. A number of small law firms, including Mikael Skjødt Advokater and Kåre Pihlmann, are also based in the building.
