= Lille Strandstræde 10 =

18th-century property in the Nyhavn Quarter of Copenhagen, Denmark

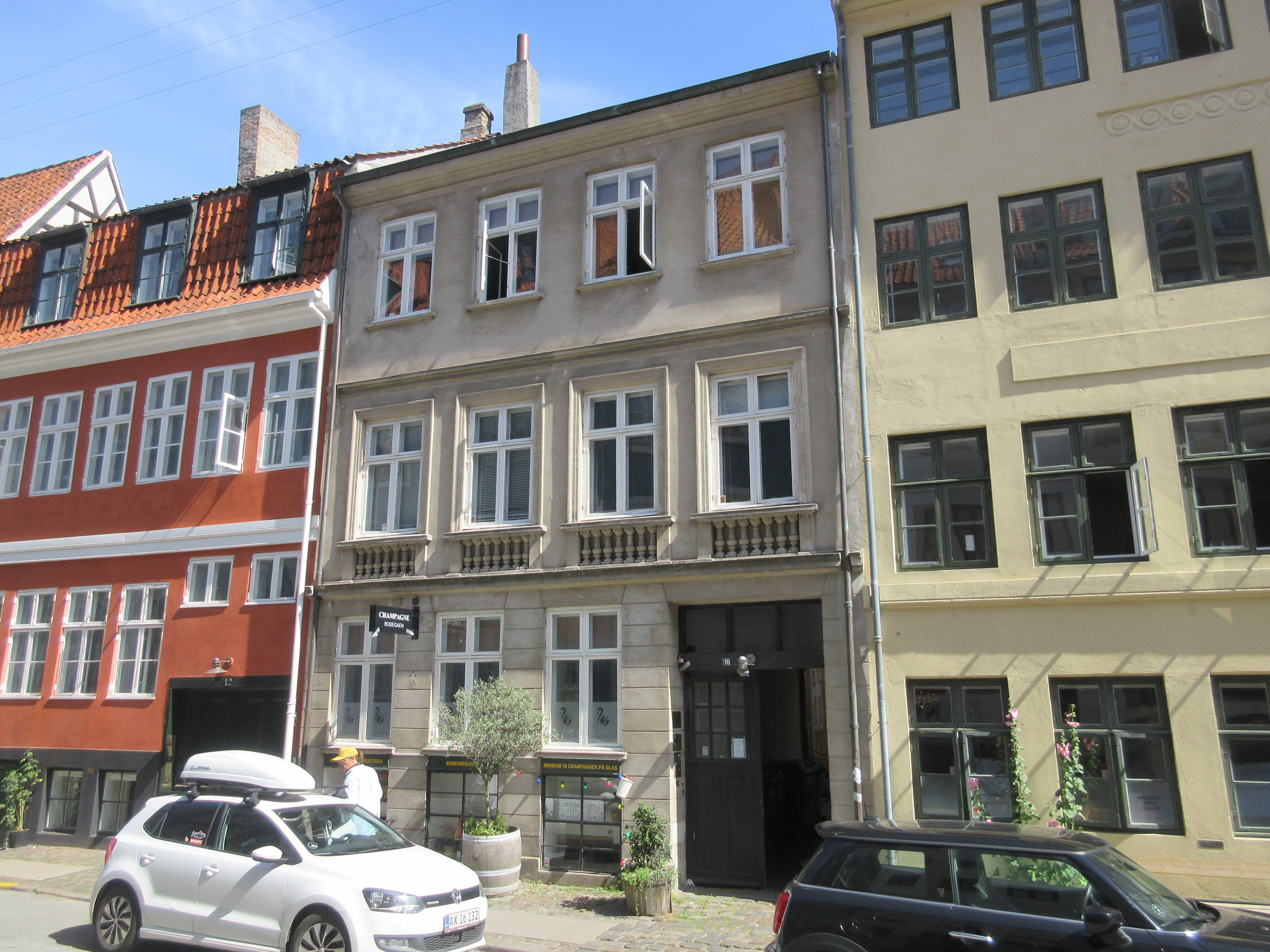
- Lille Strandstræde 10 in August 2024
- Interactive map of the Lille Strandstræde 10 area

General information
- Architectural style: Neoclassical
- Location: Copenhagen, Denmark
- Coordinates: 55°40′50.63″N 12°35′23.1″E
- Completed: 18th century
- Renovated: 1888

Lille Strandstræde 10 is an 18th-century property situated in the Nyhavn Quarter of central Copenhagen, Denmark. It was listed in the Danish registry of protected buildings and places in 1988.

== History ==
=== 18th century ===
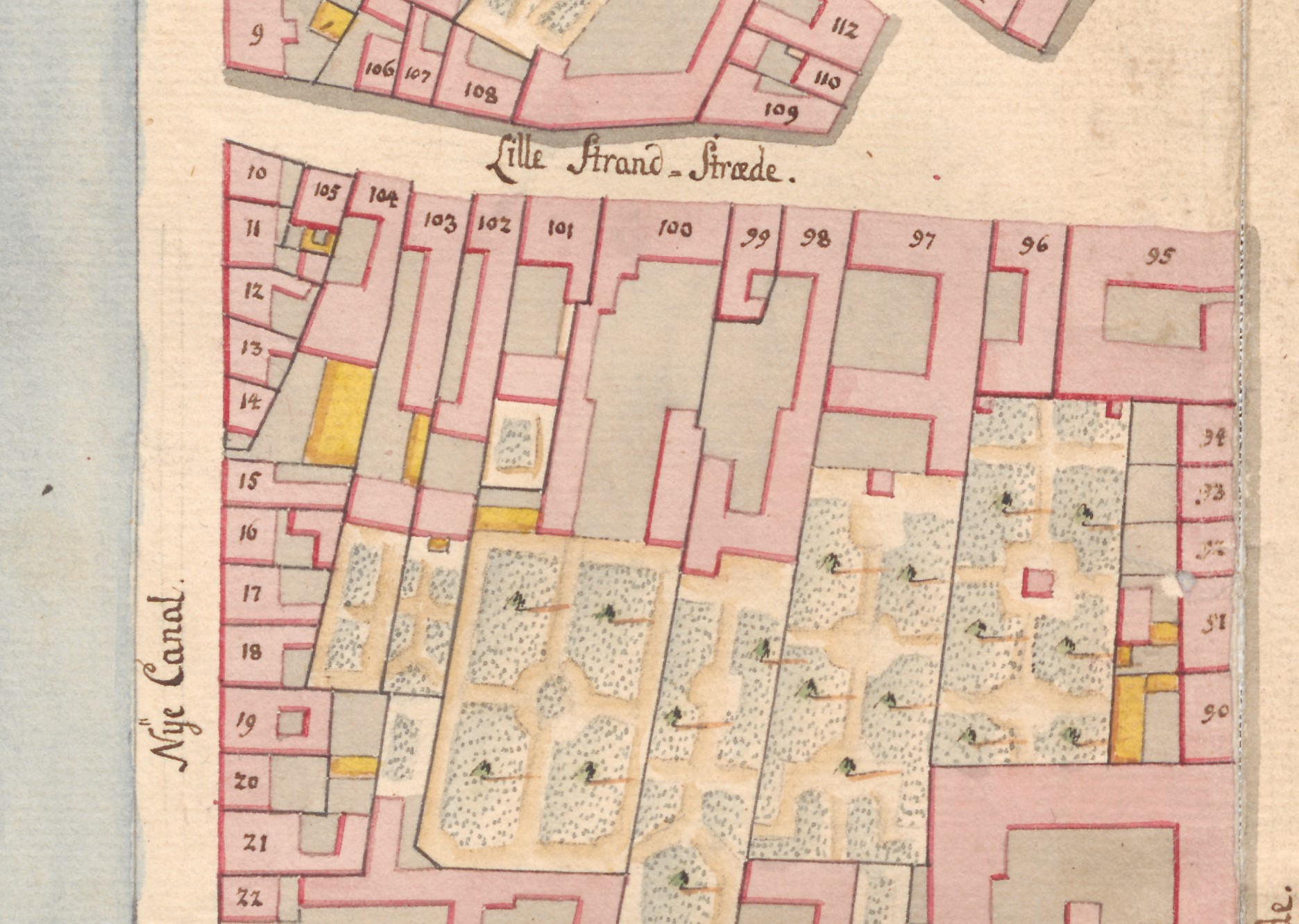
No. 102 seen in a detail from Christian Gedde's map of St. Ann's East Quarter, 1757

The property was formerly part of a larger property. This property was listed as No. 27 in St. Ann's East Quarter (Sankt Annæ Øster Kvarter) in Copenhagen's first cadastre of 1689 and was at that time owned by admiral Marcus Rodsten. It was later divided into what is now Lille Strandstræde 10 and Lille Strandstræde 12. The property now known as Lille Strandstræde 10 belonged to one major Stevens in 1731. The property was listed as No. 102 in the new cadastre of 1756 and was then owned by naval officer Diderich de Thurah.

The property was owned by Andreas Bodenhoff by 1787.

=== 19th century ===
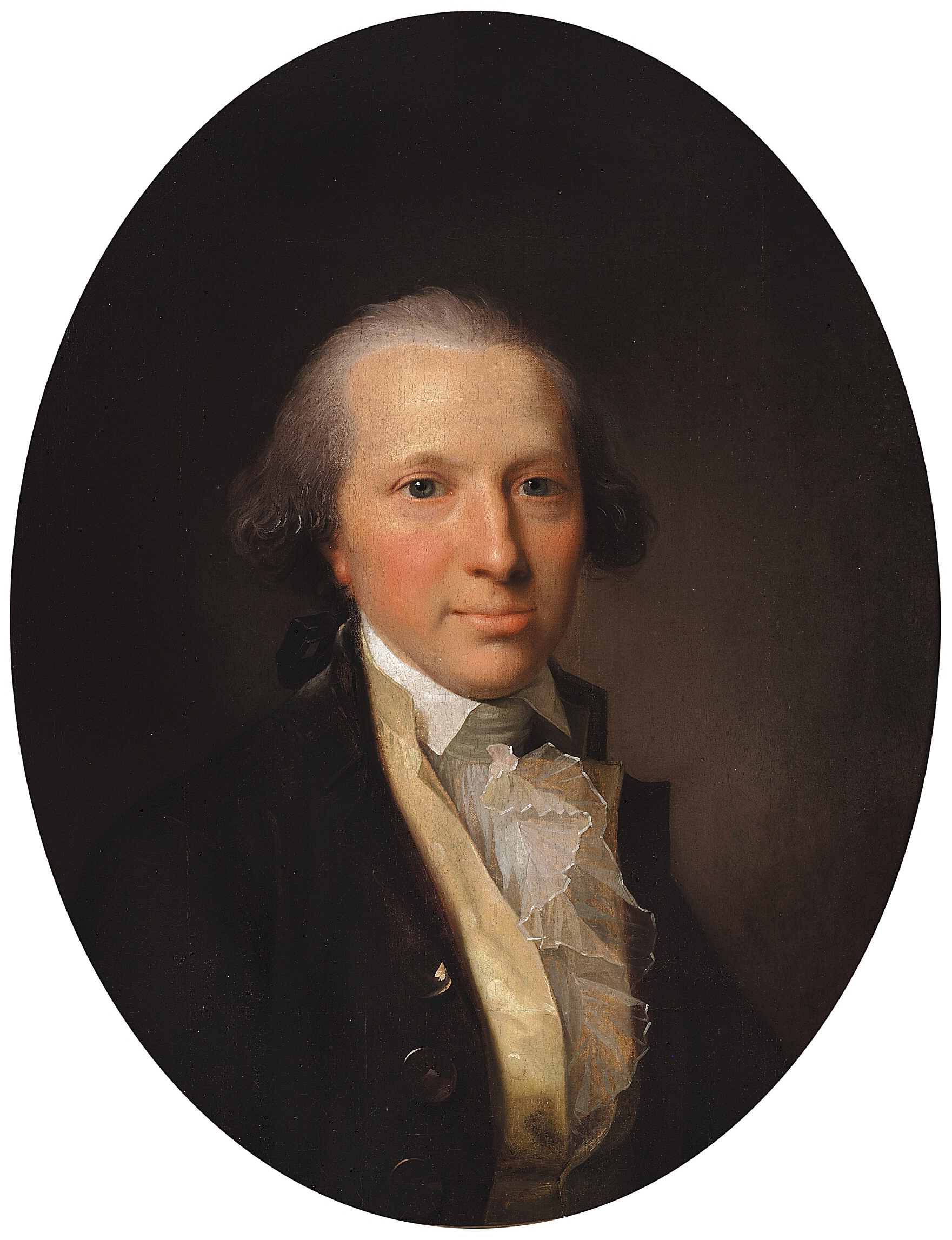
Ole Tønder Lange, painted by Jens Juel

At the time of the 1801 census, No. 102 was home to two households. William Jons, a merchant (grosserer), resided in the building with his wife Elisabeth Jons, their two children (aged 22 and 23), a caretaker and a maid. Edvard Witts, a man with means, resided in the building with his wife Anette Witts, their two children (aged 16 and 22), a caretaker and a nine-year-old boy.

The property was listed in the new cadastre of 1806 as No. 70 in St. Ann's East Quarter. It was owned by the estate owner Ole Tønder Lange (1749-1814) at that time. Lange had owned the estates Bratskov and Oxholm in Jutland. He later sold Bratskov and bought Kastrupgård on Amager.

=== Jørgen Carlsen ===
The property was later owned by skipper Jørgen Carlsen. His property was home to 24 residents in five households at the 1834 census. Jørgen Carlsen resided on the ground floor with his wife Maria Jacobine Hansen, their six daughters (aged five to 20) and skipper Folkert Rieverts. Andreas Palsen, a docker (Læsser ved Maiestra Plasen), resided on the part of the ground floor that faced the courtyard with his wife Anne Cherstine Arvesen, his brother Hans Christian Palsen (hatter) and the brother's five-year-old daughter. Wilhelm Manus Jørgensen, a master shoemaker, resided on the first floor with his wife Anne Jensen, their two-year-old daughter, a shoemaker (employee) and a shoemaker's apprentice. Hans Jensen, a guard at the Royal Palace, resided on the part of the first floor that faced the courtyard with his 12-year-old daughter and a housekeeper. Mathias Jacobsen Schauv, a tailor, resided in the garret of the rear wing with cotton manufacturer Antonette Kindstrøm and the latter's one-year-old daughter.

Carlsen's property was home to a total of 18 residents at the time of the 1840 census. Jørgen Carlsen, a skipper, resided on the ground floor with his wife Marie Jacobina Hansen, their six daughters (aged 11 to 24) and one maid. The eldest daughter ran a school for small children in the home. Niels Christensen, a sail maker, was also residing on the ground floor with his wife Maria Sophia Gensler and their two children (aged one and three). Jens Søegaard, a wig maker, resided in the building with his wife Marie Bergitte Antonsen and their 23-year-old daughter Emilie Magdalene Sophia Søegaard. Søren Ottesen, a 66-year-old man, resided in the building with his wife Anna Hansen.

=== 1860 census ===
The property was home to 26 residents in five households at the 1860 census. Dorothea Carlsen, an educator, resided in the building with her sisters Birthe Marie Carlsen and Jørgine Jacobine Carlsen, their four-year-old nephew Christian Nathalias Møller and one lodger (saddler). Bertram Clausen Holmer, a workman, resided in another apartment with his wife Karen Marie Holmer (née Jeppesen), their three children (aged four to 10) and one lodger (needlework). Anders Larsen, another workman, resided in a third apartment with his wife Sælse Marie Larsen, their three children (aged one to nine) and his mother-in-law Ane Sørensdatter. Ane Kirstine Hansen, a widow employed with washing and cleaning, resided in a fourth apartment with her three children (aged four to 11) and two lodgers. Carl Hendriksen, a master shoemaker, resided in the building with his wife Ane Sophie Lisbeth Hendriksen and their nine-year-old daughter.

=== 1880 census ===
The property was home to 20 residents at the 1880 census. Nils Johnsen, a bar owner, resided on the ground floor with his wife Henrete [Henriette??] Wilhelmine Johnsen (née Petersen), their six-year-old son Karl Martin Johnsen and two maids. Anton Bertinius Stilsig and Nikoline Stilsig, a young married couple (no profession mentioned in the census records), resided on the first floor with their three-year-old son Hans Johan Halvor Stilsig. Vilhelmine Theresia Christiansen, a widow, resided in the rear wing with her eight children (aged two to 16). Ernst Eleviro Lenartson, a mate (sturmand), and seven men seeking employment as sailors were also resident on the ground floor of the rear wing. Ole Jensen, cook for a man in Amaliegade, resided on the first floor of the rear wing with his wife Anna Jensen.

== Architecture ==
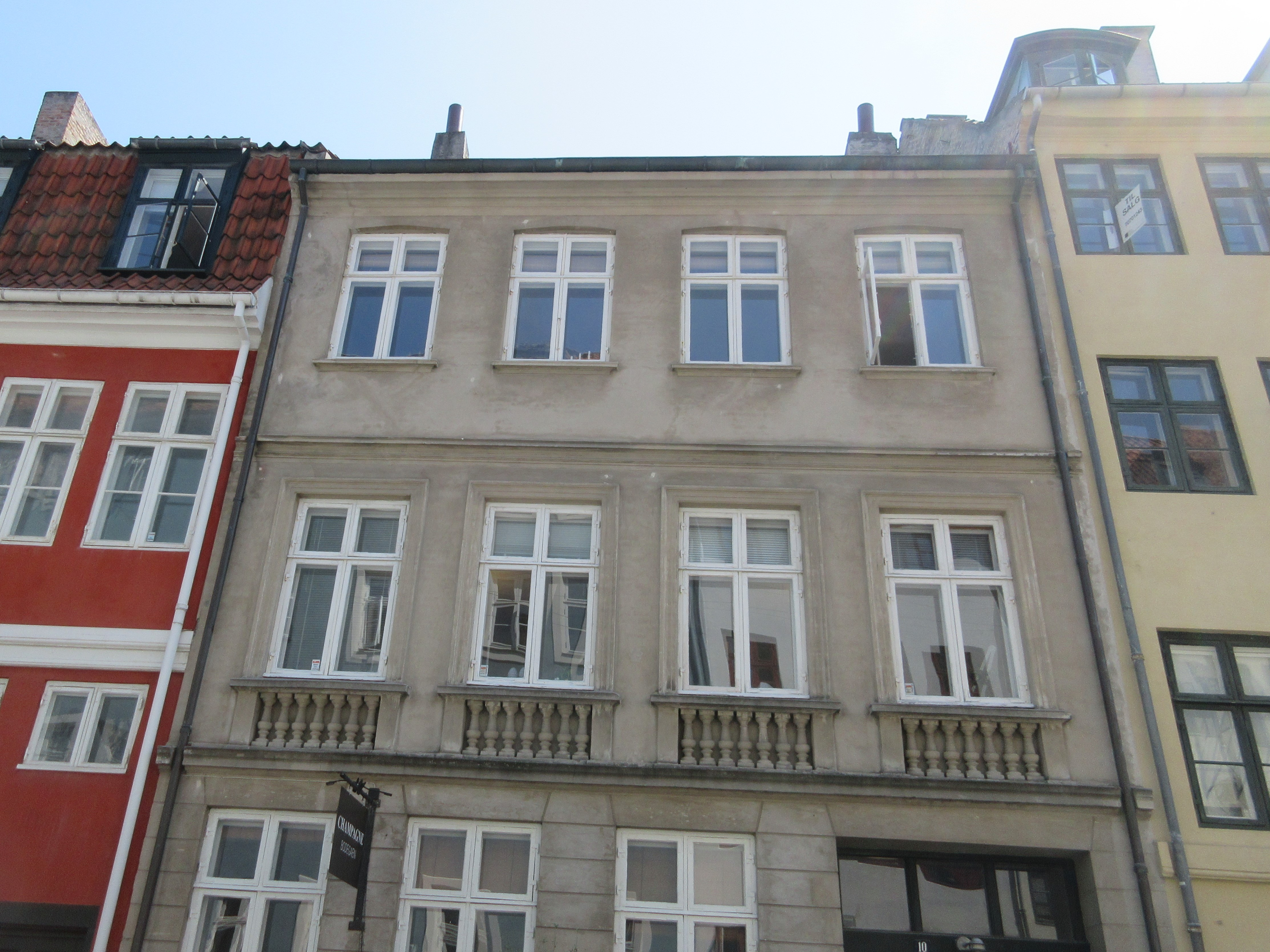
The facade

The building has three stories over a raised cellar. The front side is four bays wide and constructed in brick. It owes its current appearance to an adaption undertaken by Jens Peter Christian Hassing in 1888 with blind balustrades under the windows on the first floor.

The rear side of the building is constructed with timber framing. A half-timbered nine-bay side wing extends from the rear side of the building and is again attached to a half-timbered rear wing.

== Today ==
The building is owned by Klaus Mark Arnung. The building contains a retail space in the basement of the front wing, storage space in the basement of the side wing and a combination of office space and residential apartments on the upper floors.

== Gallery ==
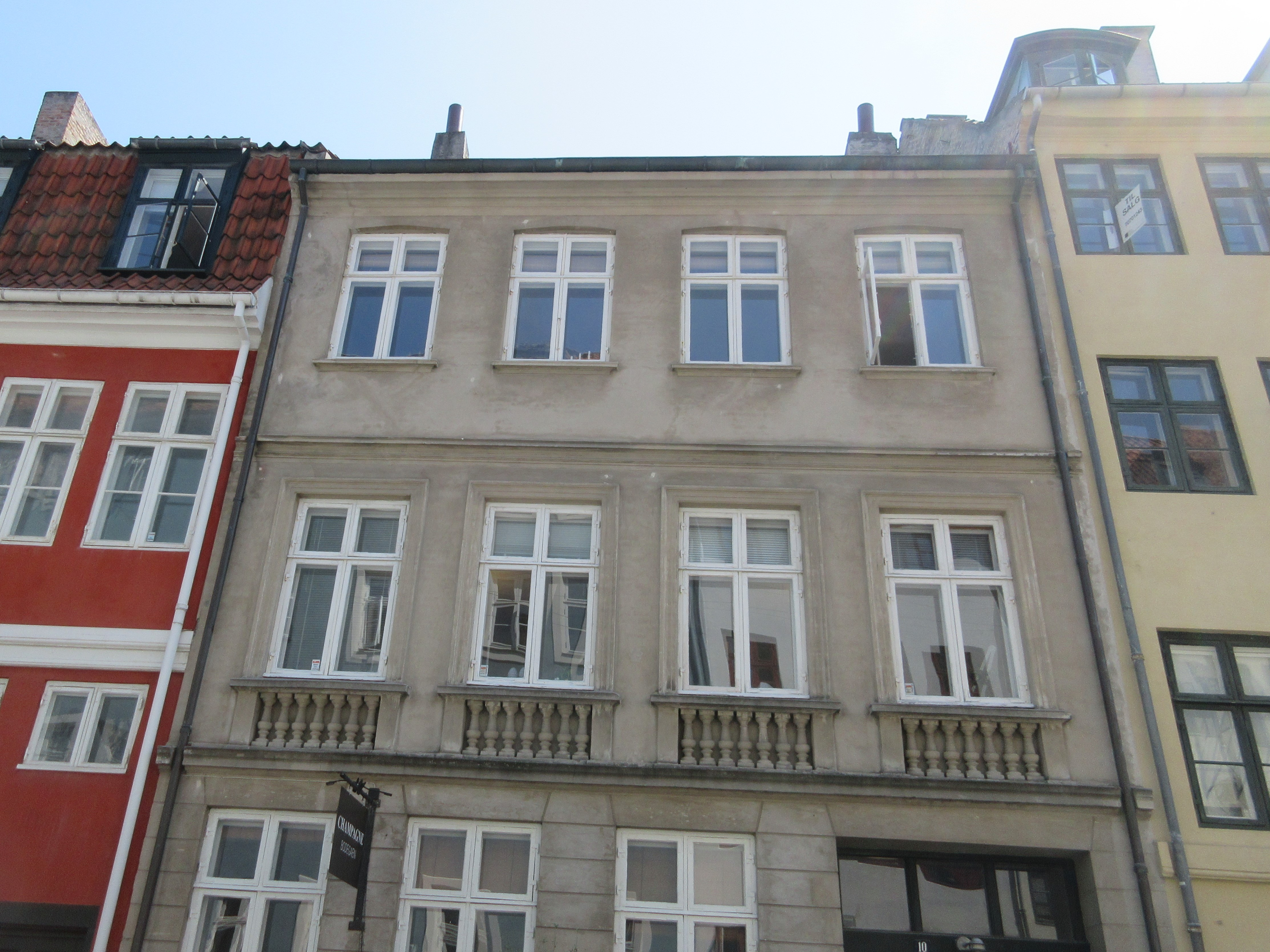
Facade detail

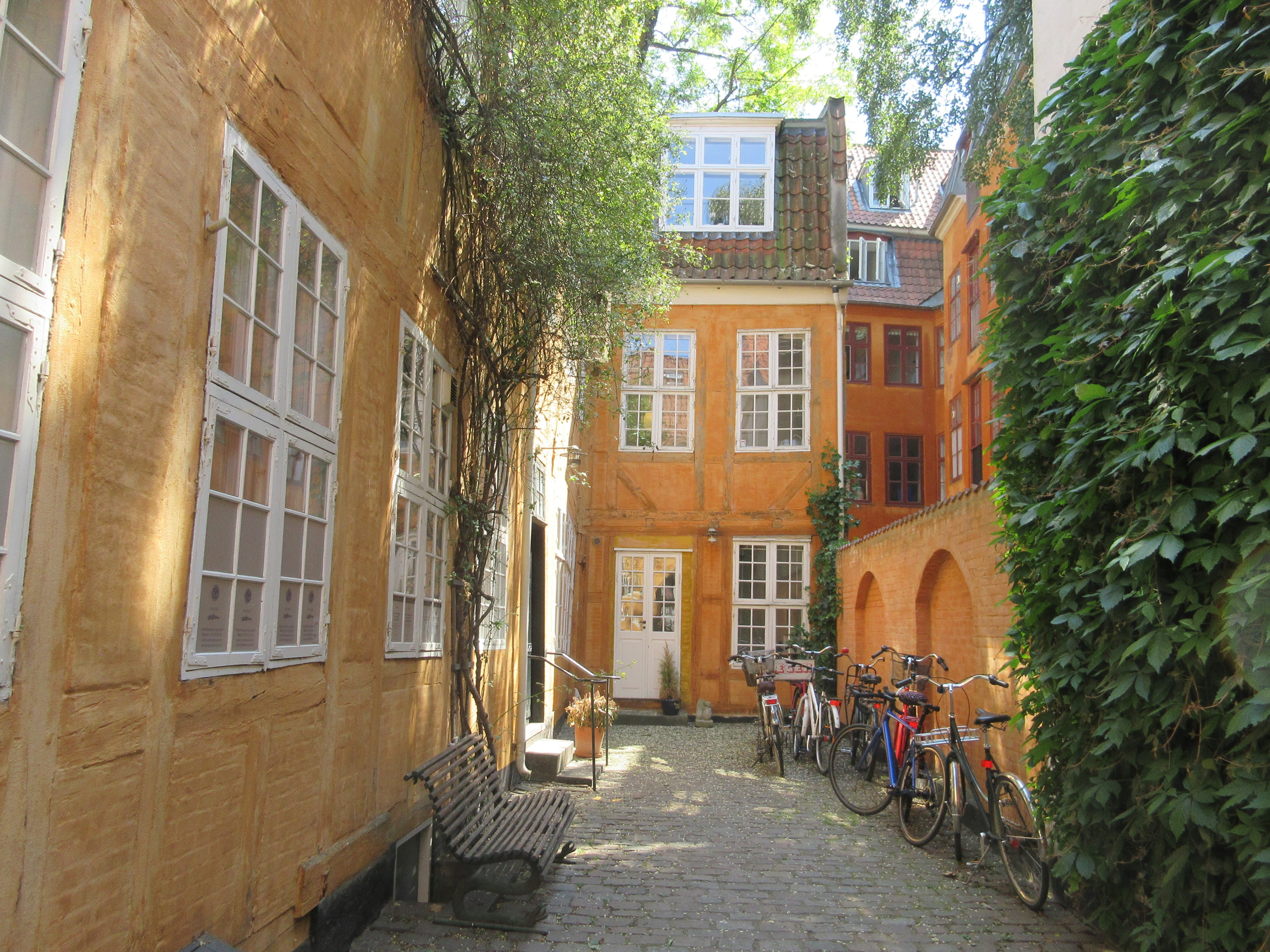
Courtyard

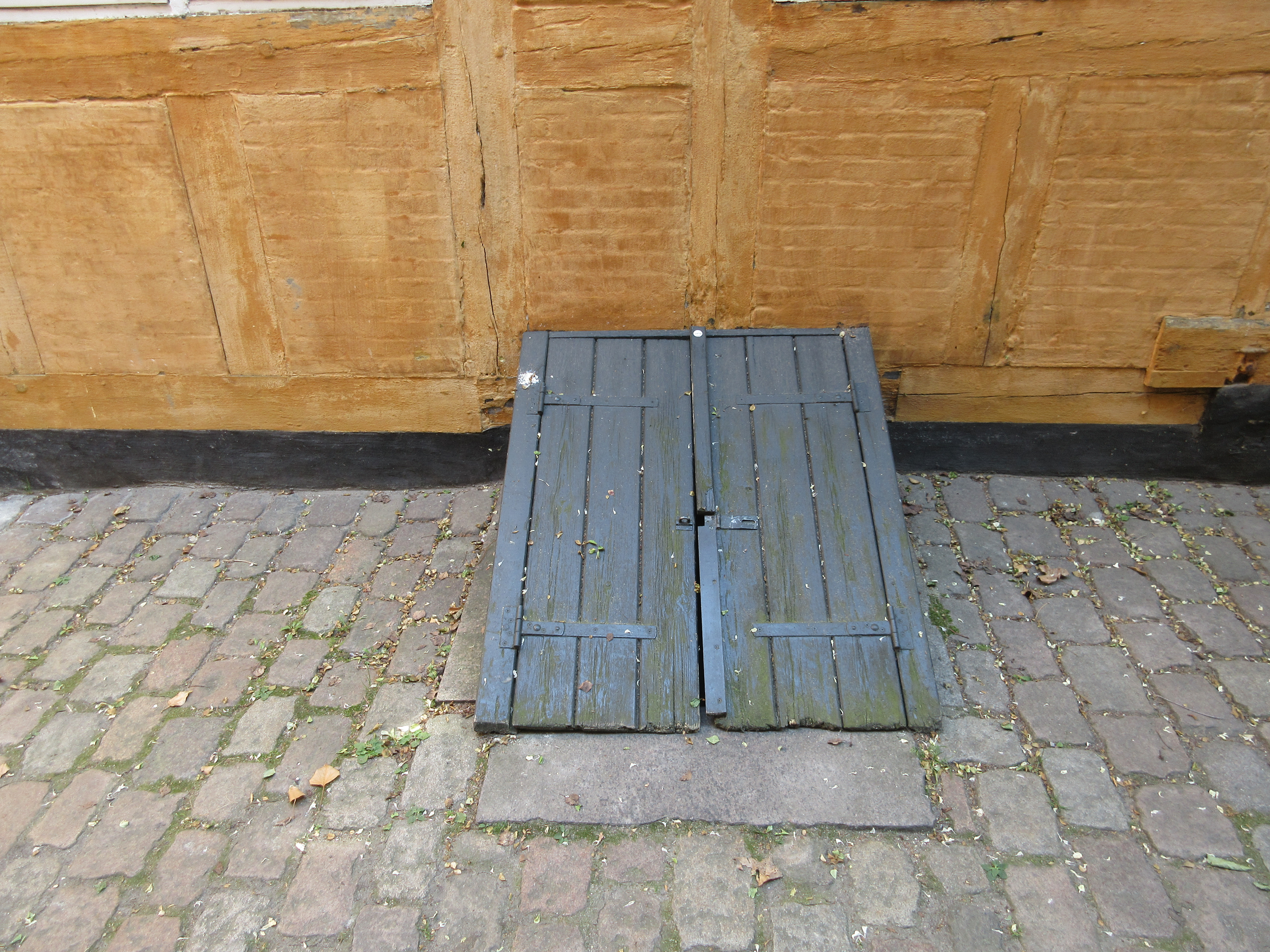
Detail from the courtyard

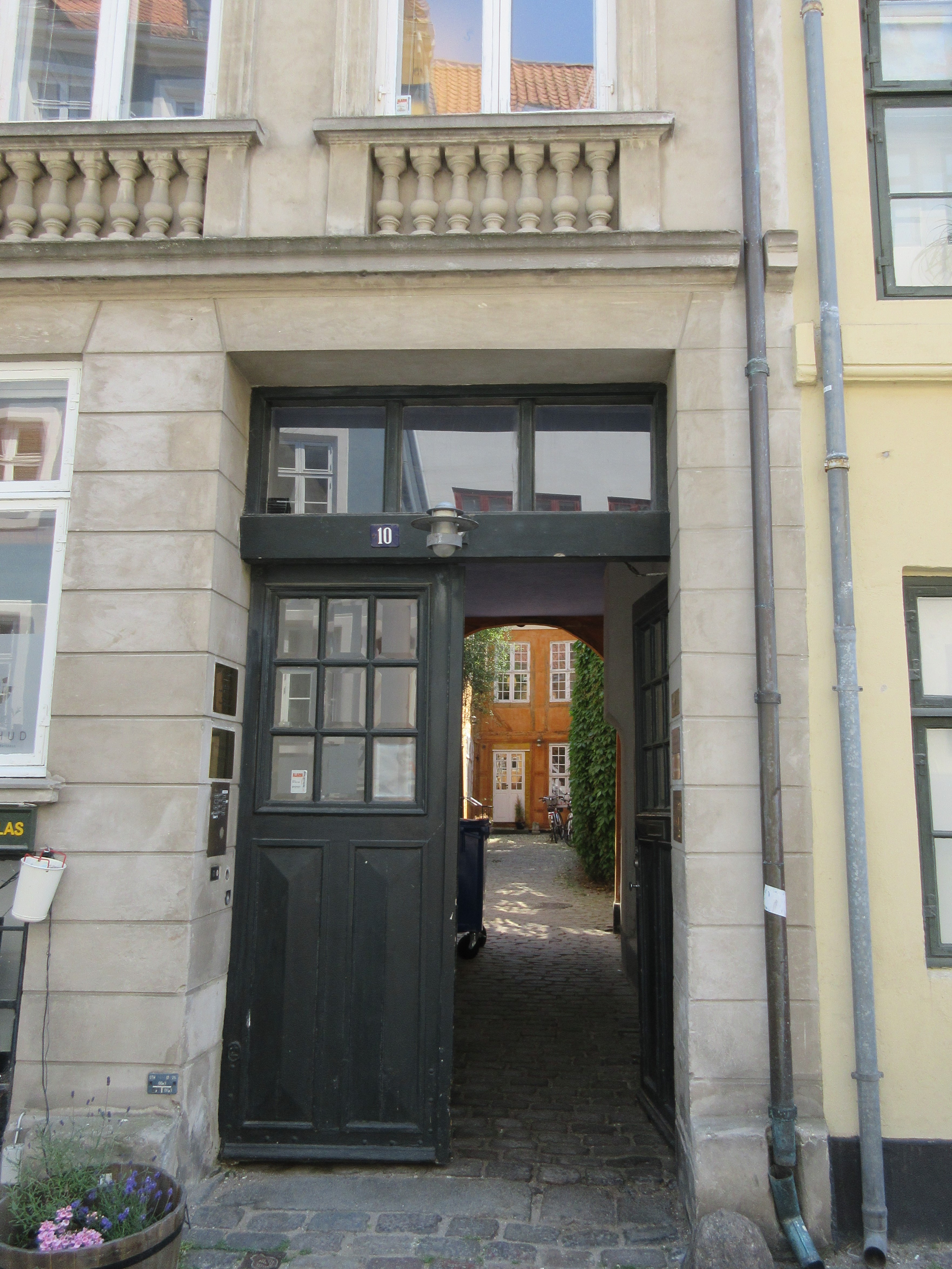
The gate

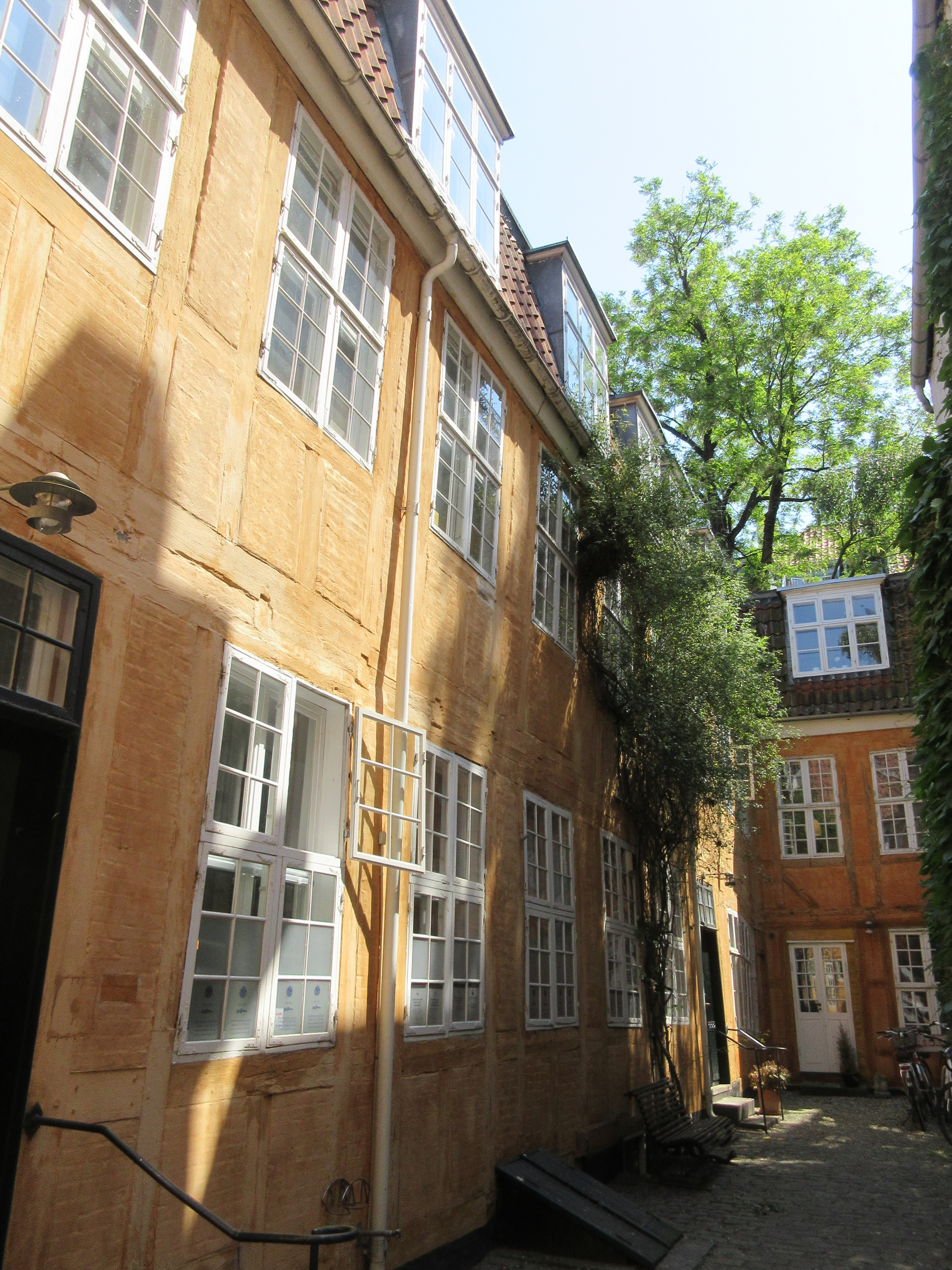
Courtyard: The perpendicular wing seen to the left

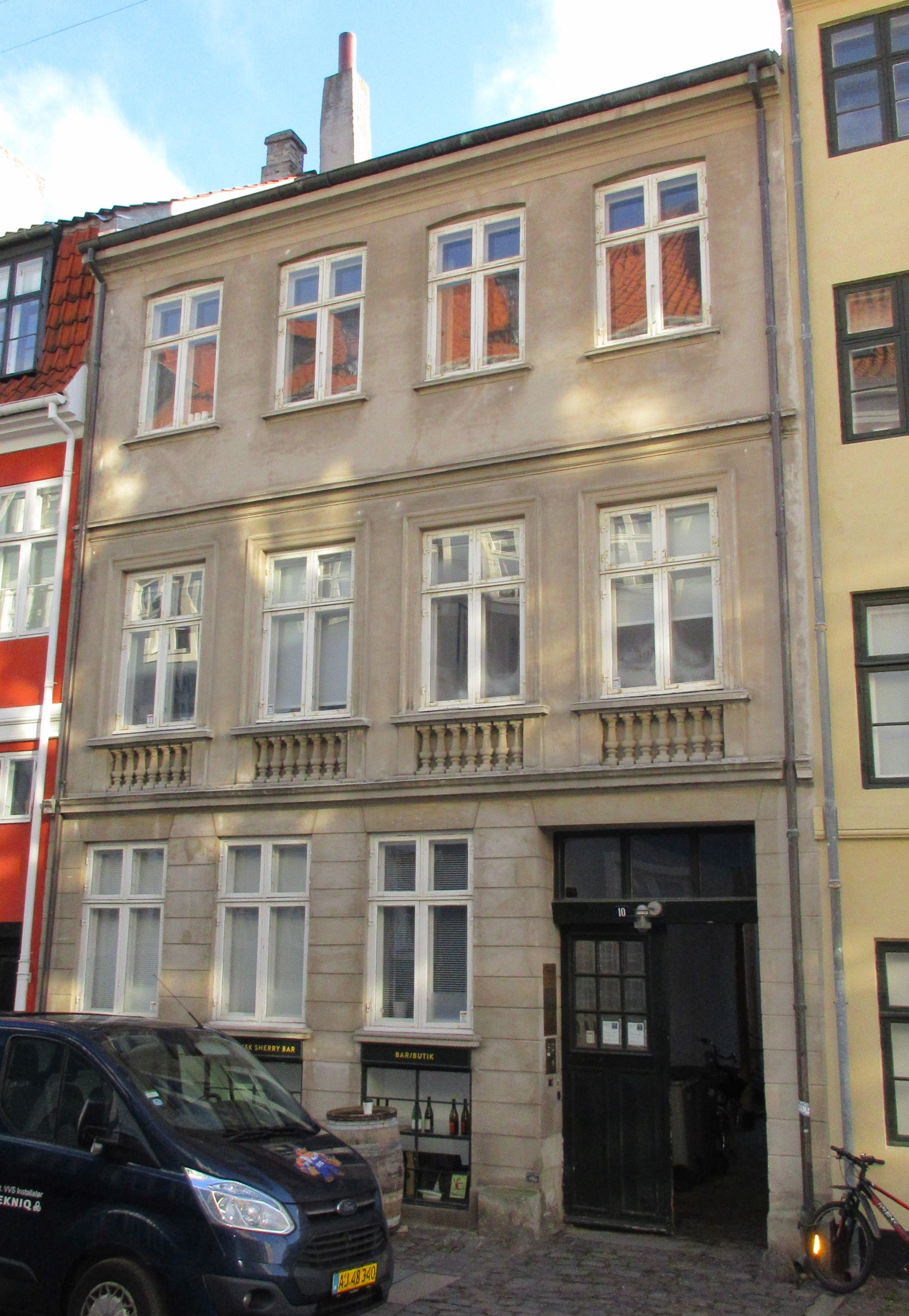
The building seen from the street

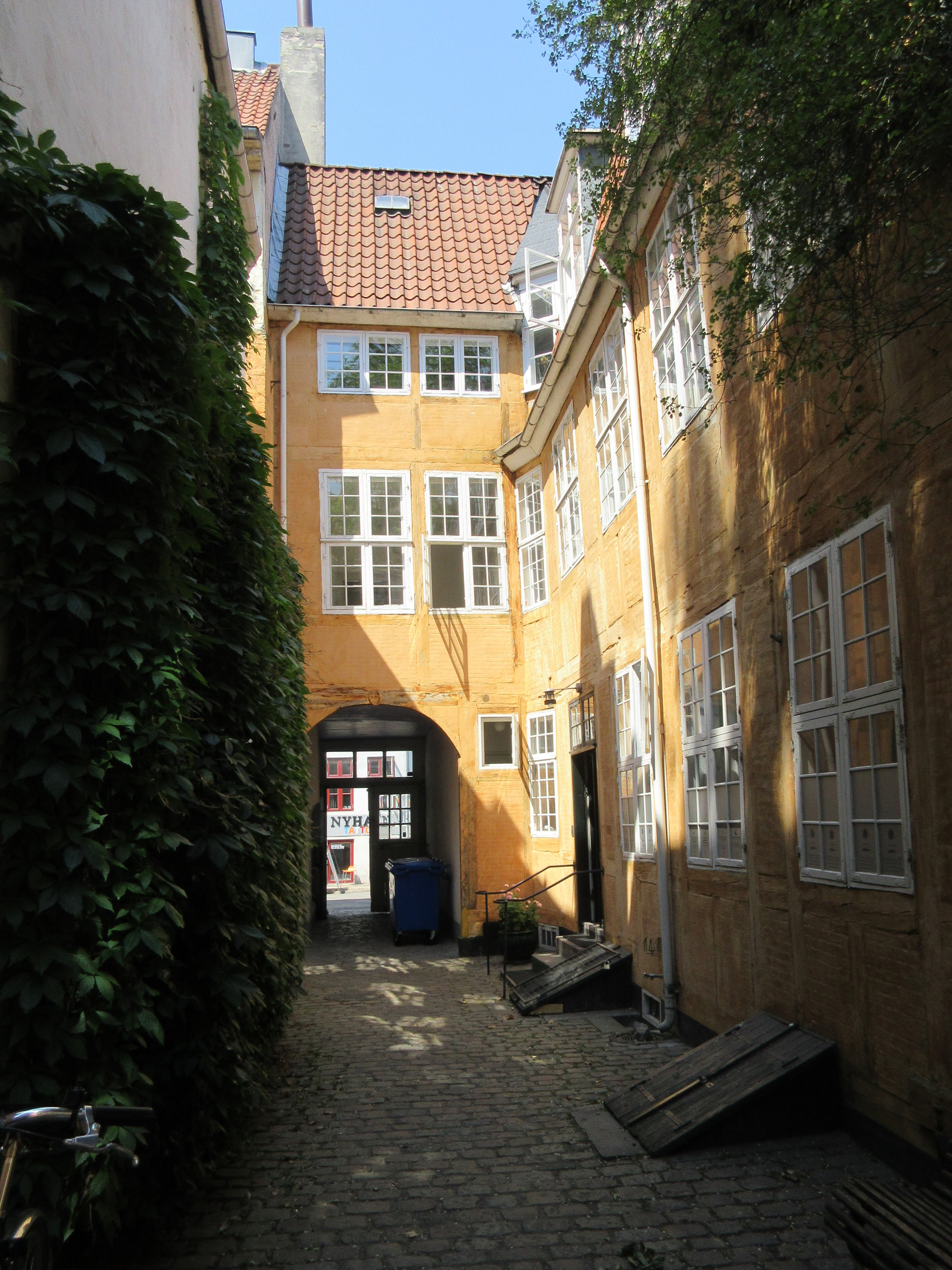
Courtyard: The rear side of the front wing
