= Athalia Schwartz =

Danish writer and educator

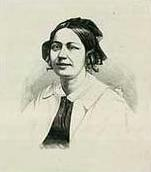
- Born: Athalia Theophilia Schwartz; 22 February 1821; Copenhagen, Denmark
- Died: 2 November 1871 (aged 50)
- Other name: Hieronymus
- Occupations: journalist, author, educator

Athalia Theophilia Schwartz (22 February 1821 – 2 November 1871), pen name Hieronymus, was a Danish writer, journalist and educator. She was an important female contributor to 19th-century Danish literature, publishing schoolbooks, poetry, drama and short stories. She was employed by Berlingske Tidende as a theatre critic. She also wrote about the conditions and lives of prostitutes in England, the Netherlands and Belgium.

== Early life ==
Athalia Theophilia Schwartz was born on February 22, 1821, in Copenhagen, Denmark. She was the daughter of Major Claus Conrad Schwartz (1796–1879), who educated army cadets, and his wife Karen Rasmine Baggesen (1796–1863). Together with her brother and five sisters she was brought up in a well-to-do home where the children were encouraged to gain independence. After attending Madam Lindes Institut, as the eldest child she took over the education of her brothers and sisters when her father was transferred to Frederikshavn in 1837, and later to Aalborg. In 1843, she opened a small school for girls.

== Career ==
In 1847, she returned to Copenhagen where she took a teachers training course. The following year, she was one of the first women to take the examination (Danish: institutbestyrerindeeksamen) which gave her the right to run a girls' school. She established a small school in 1849 in Copenhagen, though it closed in 1853. She continued to teach privately and tutored other women studying to pass the teachers examinations.

After the school's closure she focused on writing, publishing school books and fiction while contributing articles on national issues in the press. Her principal area of interest was girls' education and pedagogy, with special attention to the operation of schools. Her first work, Dansk Sproglære, was a textbook on the Danish language which she published in 1849 while her school was open. She went on to publish a number of other textbooks which concentrated on language rather than literature.

Schwartz was also a popular author of fiction, several of her works being translated into German and Swedish. Her most popular work was Livsbilleder (Images of Life), a series of short stories, the first volume of which was published in 1852. She also wrote plays, including Ruth, performed at the Royal Danish Theatre in 1854 with Johanne Luise Heiberg in the title role.

The most notable aspect of her writing was nevertheless that of a debater. Using the pen name Hieronymus, in 1851 she wrote two short books on Betragtninger over den grasserende Emancipationsfeber (Reflections on the Growing Fever of Emancipation) and En Contravisite hos Clara Raphael (A Return Visit to Clara Raphael), in which she criticized the author Mathilde Fibiger.

Using her own name, she went on to comment on the failings of Danish schools. She also was a regular writer various magazines published by Meïr Aron Goldschmidt and contributed to Berlingske Tidende as a theatre critic. She published three theatrical works of her own: Ruth, Alexei, and Charlotte Corday during the 1850s and 60s.

In 1866 she received the Anckers Scholarship (Danish: Det anckerske Legat) and conducted study trips in England, the Netherlands, and Belgium.

== Death ==
She died on 2 November 1871 at the age of 50.

== Bibliography ==
- Dansk Sproglære (1849)
- Haandbog i Undervisningskunsten (1850)
- Betragtninger over den grasserende Emancipationsfeber (1851)
- En Contravisite hos Clara Raphael (1851)
- Vandringer med Danmarks Digtere (1851)
- Livsbilleder (three volumes, 1852–1861)
- Livets Konflikter (1853)
- Ruth (1853)
- Alexei (1856)
- Livets Alvor (1858)
- Skal jeg sætte min Datter i Skole? (1859)
- Danske Landsbyhistorier (1860)
- Endnu nogle Ord om Skolevæsenet i Kjøbenhavn (1862)
- Charlotte Corday (1862)
- Cornelia (1862)
- Om Adkomstexamen til at forestaa private Skiler i Kjøbenhavn (1862)
- Stedmoder og Steddatter (1865)
- Den nationale Pigeskole (1867)
- Om Stiftelser til Sædeligheds Fremme (1867)
- Enhver sin Mission (1870)
