= Lille Strandstræde 12 =

18c property in Copenhagen

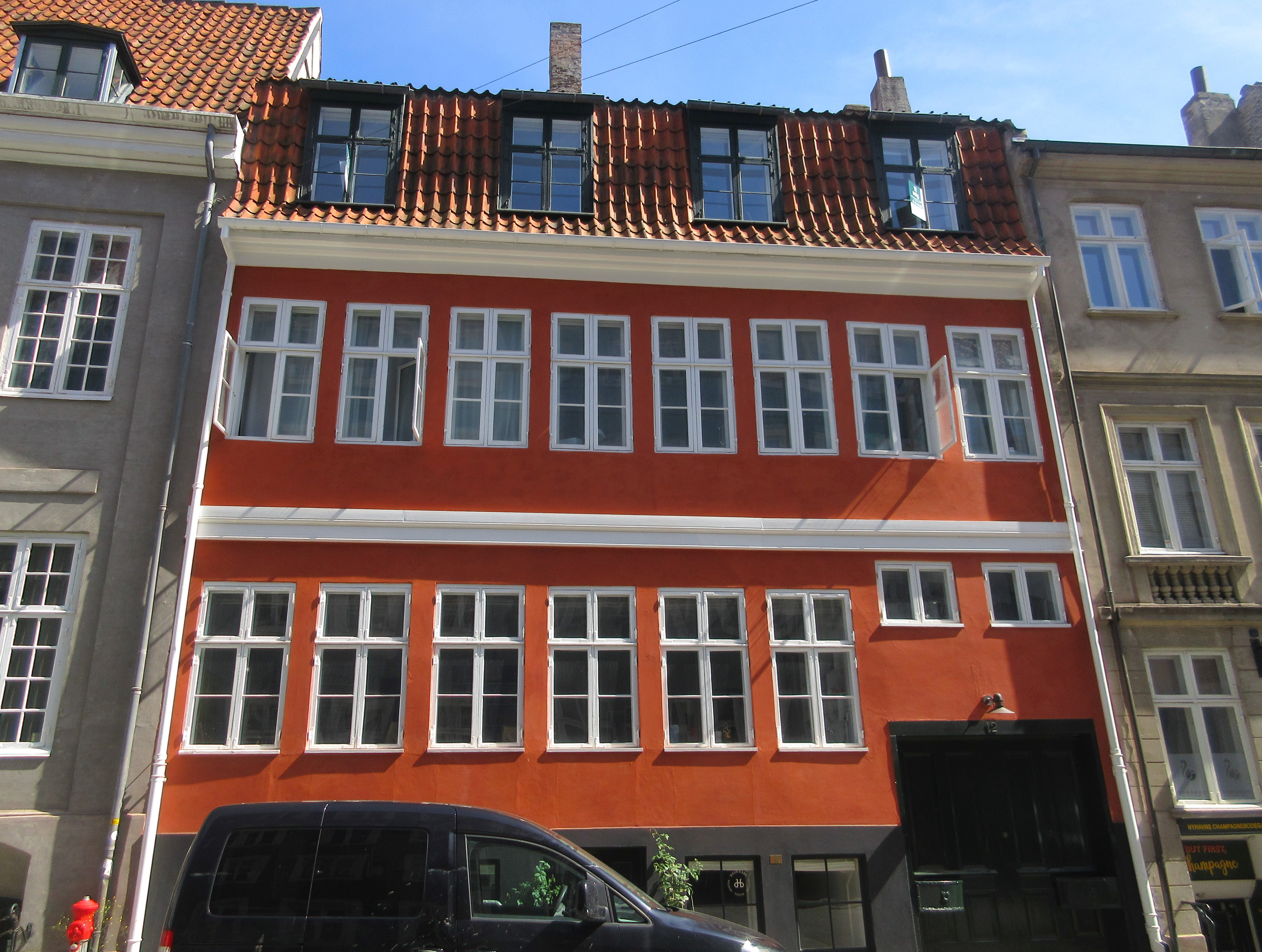
- Lille Strandstræde 12
- Interactive map of the Lille Strandstræde 12 area

General information
- Architectural style: Neoclassical
- Location: Copenhagen, Denmark
- Coordinates: 55°40′50.88″N 12°35′23.35″E
- Completed: 18th century

Lille Strandstræde 12 is an 18th-century property situated in the Nyhavn Quarter of central Copenhagen, Denmark. The building owes its current appearance to an adaptation in 1858. It was listed in the Danish registry of protected buildings and places in 1950. Notable former residents include the politician Peter Sabroe.

== History ==
=== 18th century ===
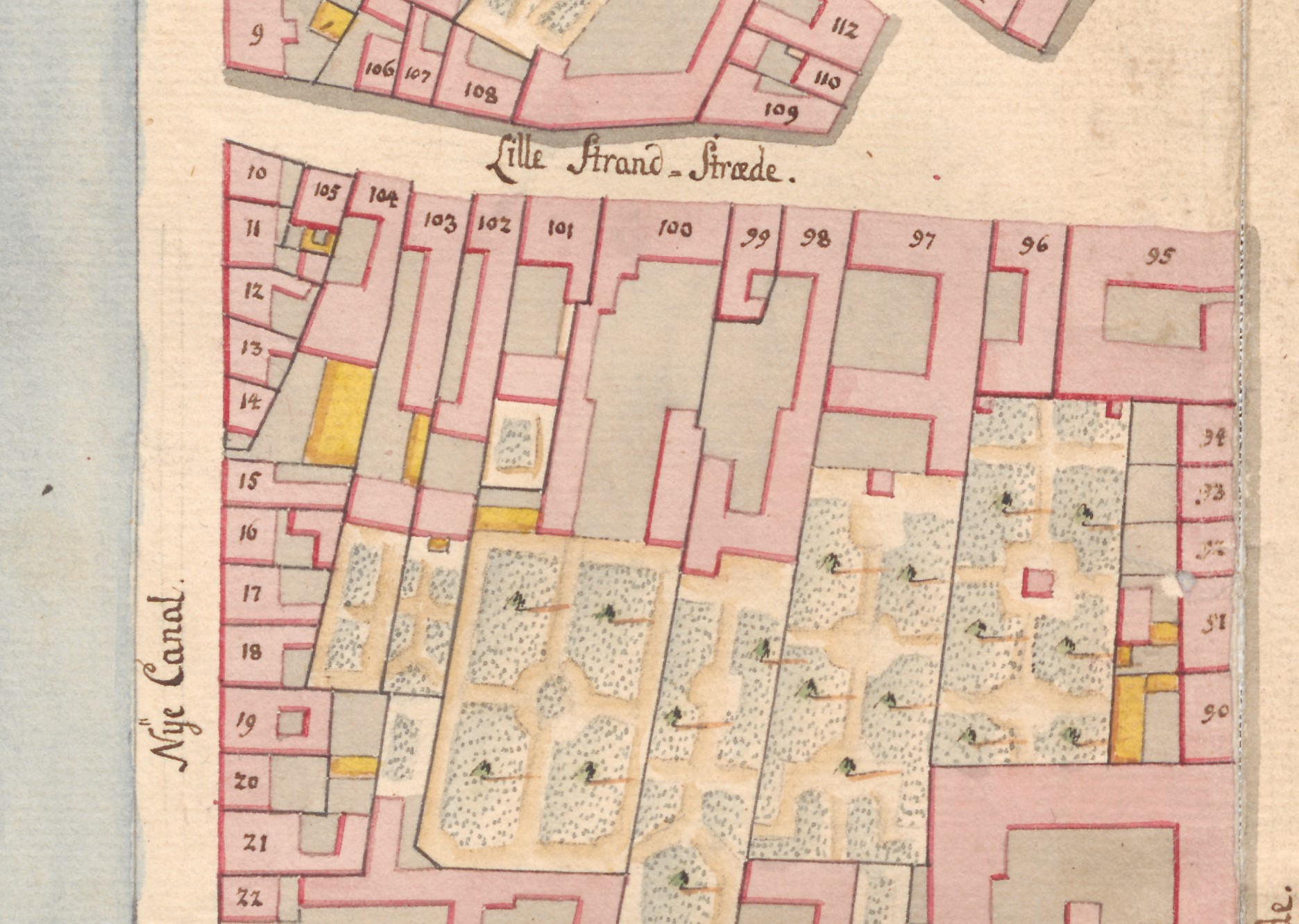
No. 101 seen in a detail from Christian Gedde's map of St. Ann's East Quarter, 1757

In the late 17th century the site was part of a larger property. It was listed as No. 27 in St. Ann's East Quarter (Sankt Annæ Kvarter) in Copenhagen's first cadastre of 1689 and was at that time owned by Admiral Marcus Rodsten. It was later divided into several smaller properties. The property now known as Lille Strandstræde 12 was listed as No. 101 in the new cadastre of 1756 and was then owned by Johan Casper Silberloh, cashier for Kjøbenhavns Brandforsikring (Copenhagen Fire Insurance).

The current building was constructed before 1732 as a clergy house in association with the Garrison Church on Sankt Annæ Plads.

The property was home to 18 residents in three households at the time of the 1787 census. Nicolai Georg Heining, a former textile merchant and the owner of the property, resided there with his wife Elisab. Louisa, their two children (aged 20 and 24), a male servant and two maids. C.M. Bozenhard, an imperial consul, resided in the building with his wife Johanne Henriette Bozenhard, a male servant and a maid. The third household consisted of Hans J. Sellerup and Else Sørens Datter, their two children (aged three and seven) and three lodgers.

=== 19th century ===
The property was home to 22 residents in three households at the 1801 census. Marsilius Knutzen (1762-1847), a judge, resided in the building with his wife Meta Kirstine Knutzen, their four children (aged two to nine), a male servant, a caretaker, two maids and an office clerk. Poul Friis, a senior clerk (fuldmægtig), resided in the building with his wife Mariane Clausen and one clerk. Anders Christiansen Schou, a beer seller (øltapper), resided in the building with his wife Christine Wils, a maid and five lodgers (all of them sailors).

Marsilius Knutzen moved to Funen later the same year when he was appointed as bailiff (herredsfoged) of Lunde, Skam og Skovby Herreder.

The property was listed in the new cadastre of 1806 as No. 69 in St. Ann's East Quarter. It was owned by Ole Lind at the time.

The property was home to a total of 35 people at the 1840 census. Johan August Schmidicke, a master chimneysweeper, resided on the ground floor with his family and a couple of employees. Carl Wilhelm Friederich von Kirchner, a captain, resided on the first floor with his wife, daughter and a maid. Johan Selch, a building painter, resided on the second floor with his wife and daughter. Maren Schmidt, a widowed cleaning lady at the Royal Danish Theatre, resided with her two daughters on the same floor. Gundel Magrete Erichsen, the widow of a cooper, continued her late husband's business in the rear wing.

The property was home to 34 residents in four households at the 1845 census. Johann August Schmideke, the master chimneysweeper from the 1840 census, resided on the ground floor with his wife Sophie Petersen, their two daughters (aged 14 and 29), five chimneysweepers, two apprentices, one male servant and one maid. Carl Wilhelm Friederich von Kirchner, the captain and now also listed as an educator, resided on the first floor with his wife Christiane Johanne (née Meyer) and two maids. Niels Svendsen, a watchman (opsigtsbetjent), resided in the building with his wife Mariane Svendsen and five unmarried women employed with needlework (two named Knutzen and three named Schmidt). Frederik Lauritz Reesen, a new master cooper, resided in the building with his wife Christine Reesen, their 11-year-old daughter, two coopers (employees), two apprentices, one male servant, one maid and one lodger.

The politician Peter Sabroe (1867–1913) was a resident in the building in 1909–1910.

== Architecture ==
Lille Strandstræde 12 owes its current appearance to an adaptation in 1858. The four central bays of the two-storey building were topped by a triangular pediment until then but it was replaced by a mansard roof clad with red tiles. The brick facade was at the same time rendered in a red colour with two white cornice bands.

The rear side of the building is constructed with red-painted timber framing and ocher-coloured infills. A nine-bay half-timbered side wing extends from the rear side of the building along the north side of a cobbled courtyard. The first four bays of the side wing are topped by a mansard roof and the remaining five bays by a monopitched roof.

The side wing is attached to a half-timbered rear wing. A gateway in the cross wing provides access to a second courtyard.

== Today ==
Lille Strandstræde 12 has been divided into condominiums and is jointly owned by the owners through E/F Lille Strandstræde 12.
