= Andreas Bodenhoff =

Danish merchant, shipowner and ship builder (1723–1794)

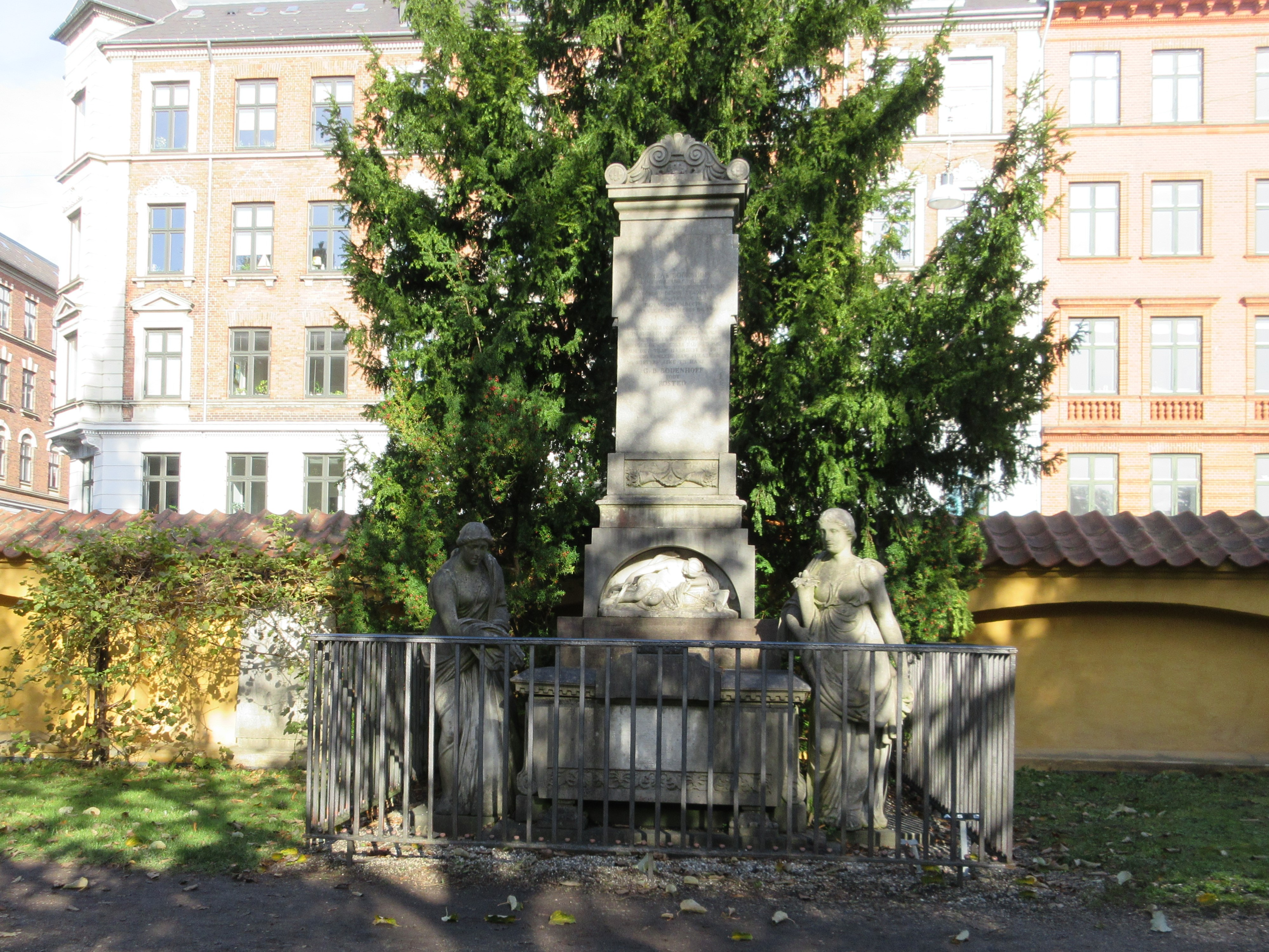
- Andreas Bodenhoff's grave at Assistens Cemetery in Copenhagen
- Born: 5 January 1723; Copenhagen, Denmark
- Died: 8 August 1794 (aged 71); Copenhagen, Denmark
- Resting place: Assistens Cemetery, Copenhagen
- Occupation: Merchant

Andreas Bodenhoff (5 January 1723 – 8 August 1794) was a Danish merchant, shipowner and ship builder. He has left his name in posterity for reclaiming the area now known as Bodenhoffs Plads on Christianshavn in Copenhagen. He was the largest private shipowner in Copenhagen by 1779.

== Early life ==
Andreas Bodenhoff was born in Copenhagen to skipper Hans Johansen Bodenhoff (c. 1697- primo 1762) and Elisabeth Bacharach (c. 1697–1761). He went to sea at an early age.

== Career ==
In 1748, Bodenhoff was licensed as a skipper in Copenhagen. 10 years later he owned several ships and property in Copenhagen. He later established a timber business which especially thrived from its deliveries to the Navy from 1762. On 12 November 1765, he was licensed as a wholesaler (grosserer). He was a protégé of Frederik Danneskiold-Samsøe, Surintendant de marine and was appointed agent in 1767.

On 17 December 1766, Bodenhoff applied for royal permission to establish a shipyard on reclaimed land to the north of Christianshavn and east of the area that Andreas Bjørn had reclaimed some ten years earlier. On 31 December that same year he was granted a 3.3 ha free site as well as tariff exemption for the timber used for the bulwarks. After reclaiming it, he established a shipyard as well as warehouses. The first ship was launched in 1771. The shipyard survived a great fire in 1778 in spite of Bodenhoff's lack of insurances. It constructed a number of large ships for the Royal Navy to a design by Henrik Germer as well as ships for the merchant navy.

In 1779, Bodenhoff was mentioned as the largest private shipowner in Copenhagen with 28 ships of which 17 were active in foreign trade.

== Personal life ==
Bodenhoff lived at Nyhavn 12. 3 March 1648, he was married to Mette Maria Andersdatter. She died in 1757. He married, for a second time, Mechthilde Catharina Rohde on 20 June 1759 in Church of Our Saviour. Mechthilde Catharina Bodenhoff died on 1 March 1770.

Andreas Bodenhoff was buried in St. Nicolas' Church but his grave was moved to Assistens Cemetery in 1797 after the church had been destroyed in the Copenhagen Fire of 1795.

Bodenhoff's eldest son, Andreas Bodenhoff Jr. (1763–1796), took over the company after his father's death. He married the daughter of his mother's sister, Gjertrud Birgitte Bodenhoff but fell ill and died in 1796. Gjertrud Birgitte Bodenhoff was then the owner of the company but died under suspicious circumstances in 1798.

Bodenhoff's daughter Gertrud Cathrine Bodenhoff (1765–1814) married Frederik Caspar Conrad Frieboe in 1795. His youngest son, Rasmus Bodenhoff, married Cathrine Lovisa Friderica Boch, daughter of the gardener at Frederiksdal. One of their granddaughters were the mother of concert pianist Golla Hammerich.

== Legacy ==
Bodenhoffs Plads in Christianshavn is named after him.

== Literature ==
- Lange, Nanna: Den bodenhoffske slægtebog, 1914 10–17.

== See also ==
- Michael Fabritius
