= September 18 =

September 18 this year in various calendars
- Friday, 18 September 2026
Akan	Kwafie
Armenian	30 Hoṙi 1476
Aztec	Tititl 11, 5 Quiyahuitl
Babylonian	5 Ululu, 2337 SE
Balinese pawukon	Luang, Pepet, Beteng, Sri, Pon, Was, Sukra of Parangbakat, Ludra, Jangur, Duka
Bengali	3 Ashshin, BS 1433
Chinese	Yin Wood Goat・Neck Mansion; Fire Horse Year, Month 8, Day 8 (Bailu, 5 days until Qiufen)
Common Era	18 September 2026 CE
Coptic	8 Thout, AM 1743
Egyptian	5 Mechir, 2775 NE
Ethiopian	8 Maskaram, 2019 Amätä Məhrät
French Republican	La Fête du Génie de l'Année 234 de la République
Gregorian	18 September, AD 2026
Hebrew	7 Tishrei, AM 5787
Hindu	Jyeṣṭhā・Prīti; Solar: 2 Āśvina, 1948 SE; Lunisolar: Saptamī, Śukla pakṣa of Bhādrapada, 2083 VE; Rāudra・5127 KY・1,872,836
Icelandic	Föstudagur, 25 Tvímánuður 2026
Islamic	5 Rabi' al-thani, AH 1448 (using tabular method)
ISO week date	2026-W38-5
Japanese	8 Hazuki, Reiwa 8 (Hakuro, 5 days until Shūbun)
Julian	5 September, AD 2026 (AM 7534)
Julian day	2461302
Korean	8 Dakdal, 4359 DE
Maya	13.0.13.16.19; 12 Chen, 5 Cauac
Roman	Nonis Septembribus, MMDCCLXXIX AUC
Solar Hijri	27 Shahrivar, SH 1405
Tibetan	7 khrums, me pho rta 2153 or 1772 or 1000

<<	September					>>
Su	Mo	Tu	We	Th	Fr	Sa
		1	2	3	4	5
6	7	8	9	10	11	12
13	14	15	16	17	18	19
20	21	22	23	24	25	26
27	28	29	30
2026

September 18 in recent years
2026 (Friday)
2025 (Thursday)
2024 (Wednesday)
2023 (Monday)
2022 (Sunday)
2021 (Saturday)
2020 (Friday)
2019 (Wednesday)
2018 (Tuesday)
2017 (Monday)

September 18 is the 261st day of the year (262nd in leap years) in the Gregorian calendar; 104 days remain until the end of the year.

== Events ==
=== Pre-1600 ===
- 96 – Emperor Domitian is assassinated as a result of a plot by his wife Domitia and two Praetorian prefects. Nerva is then proclaimed as his successor.
- 324 – Constantine the Great decisively defeats Licinius in the Battle of Chrysopolis, establishing Constantine's sole control over the Roman Empire.
- 1048 – Battle of Kapetron between a combined Byzantine-Georgian army and a Seljuq army.
- 1066 – Norwegian king Harald Hardrada lands with Tostig Godwinson at the mouth of the Humber River and begins his invasion of England.
- 1180 – Philip Augustus becomes king of France at the age of fifteen.
- 1454 – Thirteen Years' War: In the Battle of Chojnice, the Polish army is defeated by the Teutonic knights.
- 1544 – The expedition of Juan Bautista Pastene makes landfall in San Pedro Bay, southern Chile, claiming the territory for Spain.

=== 1601–1900 ===
- 1618 – The twelfth baktun in the Mesoamerican Long Count calendar begins.
- 1739 – The Treaty of Belgrade is signed, whereby Austria cedes lands south of the Sava and Danube rivers to the Ottoman Empire.
- 1759 – French and Indian War: The Articles of Capitulation of Quebec are signed.
- 1809 – The Royal Opera House in Covent Garden, London, opens.
- 1810 – First Government Junta in Chile. Though supposed to rule only during the Peninsular War in Spain, it is in fact the first step towards independence from Spain, and is commemorated as such.
- 1837 – Tiffany & Co. (first named Tiffany & Young) is founded by Charles Lewis Tiffany and Teddy Young in New York City. The store is called a "stationery and fancy goods emporium".
- 1838 – The Anti-Corn Law League is established by Richard Cobden.
- 1850 – The U.S. Congress passes the Fugitive Slave Act of 1850.
- 1860 – Second Opium War: Battle of Zhangjiawan: Now heading towards Beijing after having recently occupied Tianjin, the allied Anglo-French force engages and defeats a larger Qing Chinese army at Zhangjiawan.
- 1860 – Wars of Italian Unification: Battle of Castelfidardo: Royal Sardinian Army defeats forces of the Papal States, resulting in the conquest of Umbria and Marche by the Kingdom of Italy.
- 1862 – The Confederate States celebrate for the first and only time a Thanksgiving Day.
- 1863 – American Civil War: The Battle of Chickamauga begins between Confederate and Union forces. It involves the second highest amount of casualties for any American Civil War battle apart from Gettysburg.
- 1864 – American Civil War: John Bell Hood begins the Franklin–Nashville Campaign in an unsuccessful attempt to draw William Tecumseh Sherman back out of Georgia.
- 1867 – The first provincial election for the Nova Scotia Legislative Assembly after Canada's Confederation returns a large majority for the Anti-Confederation Party, led by William Annand, who becomes Premier.
- 1867 – The fourth and current State Constitution of Maryland is ratified by voters.
- 1870 – During an expedition to the Wyoming Territory, Henry D. Washburn observes and names the Old Faithful Geyser.
- 1873 – The U.S. bank Jay Cooke & Company declares bankruptcy, contributing to the Panic of 1873.
- 1882 – The Pacific Stock Exchange opens.
- 1885 – Five Chinese people were lynched outside of Pierce City in the Idaho Territory of the United States.
- 1898 – The Fashoda Incident triggers the last war scare between Britain and France.

=== 1901–present ===
- 1906 – The 1906 Hong Kong typhoon kills an estimated 10,000 people.
- 1910 – In Washington, D.C., George Owen Squier demonstrated the first system to allow multiplexing of telephone transmissions, sending a message between two laboratories of the U.S. Signal Corps.
- 1914 – The Irish Home Rule Act becomes law, but is delayed until after World War I.
- 1915 – The Saturday Evening Post publishes the short story "Extricating Young Gussie" by P.G. Wodehouse, featuring the first appearance of Bertie Wooster and his valet Jeeves.
- 1919 – Fritz Pollard becomes the first African American to play professional football for a major team, the Akron Pros.
- 1919 – In the Netherlands, a law granting full voting rights to women is granted royal assent by Queen Wilhelmina.
- 1921 – Rif War: In Ajdir, Spanish Morocco, a secessionist group of Berbers led by Abd el-Krim proclaim the Republic of the Rif, in rebellion against the Sultan of Morocco and the Spanish Army. French and Spanish forces suppress the Republic by May 1926.
- 1922 – The Kingdom of Hungary is admitted to the League of Nations.
- 1924 – The U.S. ends its military occupation of the Dominican Republic, after invading in May 1916 to force the Dominican government to pay its debts to European creditors.
- 1926 – A hurricane devastates Miami, Florida, killing 372 people.
- 1927 – The Columbia Broadcasting System goes on the air.
- 1928 – Juan de la Cierva makes the first Autogyro crossing of the English Channel.
- 1931 – Imperial Japan instigates the Mukden incident as a pretext to invade and occupy Manchuria.
- 1932 – The body of actress Peg Entwistle is discovered by police, two days after her suicide by jumping off of the Hollywoodland sign.
- 1934 – The Soviet Union is admitted to the League of Nations.
- 1939 – World War II: The Polish government of Ignacy Mościcki flees to Romania.
- 1939 – World War II: The radio show Germany Calling begins transmitting Nazi propaganda.
- 1941 – World War II: The Soviet Union introduces conscription for all males between the ages of 16 and 50.
- 1943 – World War II: Adolf Hitler orders the deportation of Danish Jews.
- 1944 – World War II: The British submarine HMS Tradewind torpedoes Jun'yō Maru, killing 5,600, mostly slave labourers and POWs.
- 1944 – World War II: Operation Market Garden results in the liberation of Eindhoven.
- 1944 – World War II: The Battle of Arracourt begins.
- 1945 – General Douglas MacArthur moves his general headquarters from Manila to Tokyo.
- 1947 – The National Security Act reorganizes the United States government's military and intelligence services.
- 1948 – Operation Polo is terminated after the Indian Army accepts the surrender of the army of Hyderabad.
- 1948 – Margaret Chase Smith of Maine becomes the first woman elected to the United States Senate without completing another senator's term.
- 1950 – Korean War: U.S. Eighth Army and United Nations forces break out of the Pusan Perimeter in southeast Korea.
- 1950 – TV Tupi Difusora, the first television station to broadcast in Brazil, begins transmissions on Channel 3 in São Paulo.
- 1954 – Finnish president J. K. Paasikivi becomes the first Western head of state to be awarded the highest honor of the Soviet Union, the Order of Lenin.
- 1961 – United Nations Secretary-General Dag Hammarskjöld dies in an air crash while attempting to negotiate peace in the Katanga region of the Democratic Republic of the Congo.
- 1962 – Burundi, Jamaica, Rwanda and Trinidad and Tobago are admitted to the United Nations.
- 1962 – Aeroflot Flight 213 crashes into a mountain near Chersky Airport, killing 32 people.
- 1964 – The wedding of Constantine II of Greece and Princess Anne-Marie of Denmark takes place in Athens.
- 1964 – The first television adaptation of Charles Addams's "The Addams Family" premieres on ABC Television.
- 1974 – Hurricane Fifi strikes Honduras with 110 mph winds, killing 5,000 people.
- 1980 – A fuel leak from a Titan II intercontinental ballistic missile at a USAF base near Damascus, Arkansas, results in an explosion in a missile silo, killing one person and injuring 21 others.
- 1988 – The 8888 Uprising in Myanmar comes to an end.
- 1988 – General Henri Namphy, president of Haiti, is ousted from power in a coup d'état led by General Prosper Avril.
- 1988 – The Magna Charta Universitatum, asserting key principles essential to the free operation of universities, is signed in Bologna by the rectors of 388 institutions of higher learning, to commemorate the 900th anniversary of the University of Bologna.
- 1989 – An attempted coup d'état against Burkina Faso president Blaise Compaoré is uncovered and foiled.
- 1990 – Liechtenstein becomes a member of the United Nations.
- 1997 – The Anti-Personnel Mine Ban Convention is adopted.
- 2001 – First mailing of anthrax letters from Trenton, New Jersey in the 2001 anthrax attacks.
- 2007 – Buddhist monks join anti-government protesters in Myanmar, starting what some call the Saffron Revolution.
- 2011 – The 2011 Sikkim earthquake is felt across northeastern India, Nepal, Bhutan, Bangladesh and southern Tibet.
- 2013 – A VIA Rail train crashes into a double-decker bus at a train station in Ottawa, Canada, killing six people and injuring 35 others.
- 2014 – Scotland votes against independence from the United Kingdom, by 55% to 45%.
- 2015 – Two security personnel, 17 worshippers in a mosque, and 13 militants are killed during a Tehrik-i-Taliban Pakistan attack on a Pakistan Air Force base on the outskirts of Peshawar.
- 2016 – The 2016 Uri attack in Jammu and Kashmir, India by terrorist group Jaish-e-Mohammed results in the deaths of nineteen Indian Army soldiers and all four attackers.

== Births ==
=== Pre-1600 ===
- AD 53 – Trajan, Roman emperor (died 117)
- 524 – Kan Bahlam I, ruler of Palenque (died 583)
- 1091 – Andronikos Komnenos, Byzantine prince and general (died 1130/31)
- 1344 – Marie of France, Duchess of Bar (died 1404)
- 1434 – Eleanor of Portugal, Holy Roman Empress (died 1467)
- 1501 – Henry Stafford, 1st Baron Stafford (died 1563)
- 1554 – Haydar Mirza Safavi, Safavid prince (died 1576)
- 1587 – Francesca Caccini, Italian singer-songwriter and lute player (died 1640)

=== 1601–1900 ===
- 1606 – Zhang Xianzhong, Chinese rebel leader (died 1647)
- 1643 – Gilbert Burnet, Scottish bishop, historian, and theologian (died 1715)
- 1676 – Eberhard Louis, Duke of Württemberg (died 1733)
- 1684 – Johann Gottfried Walther, German organist and composer (died 1748)
- 1709 – Samuel Johnson, English lexicographer and poet (died 1784)
- 1711 – Ignaz Holzbauer, Austrian composer and educator (died 1783)
- 1733 – George Read, American lawyer and politician, 3rd Governor of Delaware (died 1798)
- 1750 – Tomás de Iriarte y Oropesa, Spanish poet and playwright (died 1791)
- 1752 – Adrien-Marie Legendre, French mathematician and theorist (died 1833)
- 1765 – Pope Gregory XVI (died 1846)
- 1779 – Joseph Story, American lawyer, jurist, and politician (died 1845)
- 1786 – Christian VIII of Denmark (died 1848)
- 1786 – Justinus Kerner, German poet and author (died 1862)
- 1812 – Herschel Vespasian Johnson, American lawyer and politician, 41st Governor of Georgia (died 1880)
- 1819 – Léon Foucault, French physicist and academic (died 1868)
- 1837 – Aires de Ornelas e Vasconcelos, Portuguese archbishop (died 1880)
- 1838 – Anton Mauve, Dutch painter and educator (died 1888)
- 1844 – Cassius Marcellus Coolidge, American artist (died 1934)
- 1846 – Richard With, Norwegian captain, businessman, and politician, founded Vesteraalens Dampskibsselskab (died 1930)
- 1848 – Francis Grierson, English-American pianist and composer (died 1927)
- 1857 – John Hessin Clarke, American lawyer and judge (died 1945)
- 1858 – Kate Booth, English Salvation Army officer (died 1955)
- 1859 – John L. Bates, American lawyer and politician, 41st Governor of Massachusetts (died 1946)
- 1859 – Lincoln Loy McCandless, American businessman and politician (died 1940)
- 1860 – Alberto Franchetti, Italian-American composer and educator (died 1942)
- 1870 – Clark Wissler, American anthropologist, author, and educator (died 1947)
- 1872 – Carl Friedberg, German-Italian pianist and educator (died 1955)
- 1872 – Adolf Schmal, Austrian fencer and cyclist (died 1919)
- 1875 – Tomás Burgos, Chilean philanthropist (died 1945)
- 1876 – James Scullin, Australian journalist and politician, 9th Prime Minister of Australia (died 1953)
- 1878 – James O. Richardson, American admiral (died 1974)
- 1883 – Gerald Tyrwhitt-Wilson, 14th Baron Berners, English composer, painter, and author (died 1950)
- 1883 – Andre Morize, professor of French literature at Harvard University (died 1957)
- 1885 – Uzeyir Hajibeyov, Azerbaijani composer, conductor, and playwright (died 1948)
- 1886 – Powel Crosley Jr., American entrepreneur (died 1961)
- 1888 – Grey Owl, English-Canadian environmentalist and author (died 1938)
- 1888 – Toni Wolff, Swiss psychologist and author (died 1953)
- 1889 – Doris Blackburn, Australian activist and politician (died 1970)
- 1889 – Leslie Morshead, Australian general, businessman, and educator (died 1959)
- 1891 – Rafael Pérez y Pérez, Spanish author (died 1984)
- 1893 – Arthur Benjamin, Australian pianist, composer, and conductor (died 1960)
- 1893 – William March, American soldier and author (died 1954)
- 1894 – Fay Compton, English actress (died 1978)
- 1895 – Jean Batmale, French footballer and manager (died 1973)
- 1895 – John Diefenbaker, Canadian lawyer and politician, 13th Prime Minister of Canada (died 1979)
- 1895 – Walter Koch, German astrologer and author (died 1970)
- 1897 – Pablo Sorozábal, Spanish composer and conductor (died 1988)
- 1900 – Willis Laurence James, American violinist and educator (died 1966)
- 1900 – Seewoosagur Ramgoolam, Mauritian philanthropist and politician, 1st Prime Minister of Mauritius (died 1985)

=== 1901–present ===
- 1901 – Harold Clurman, American director and producer (died 1980)
- 1904 – Bun Cook, Canadian ice hockey player and coach (died 1988)
- 1904 – David Eccles, 1st Viscount Eccles, English businessman and politician, Secretary of State for Education (died 1999)
- 1905 – Eddie "Rochester" Anderson, American actor (died 1977)
- 1905 – Agnes de Mille, American dancer and choreographer (died 1993)
- 1905 – Greta Garbo, Swedish-American actress (died 1990)
- 1906 – Kaka Hathrasi, Indian poet and author (died 1995)
- 1906 – Maurice Maillot, French actor (died 1968)
- 1906 – Julio Rosales, Filipino cardinal (died 1983)
- 1907 – Leon Askin, Austrian actor (died 2005)
- 1907 – Edwin McMillan, American physicist and chemist, Nobel Prize laureate (died 1991)
- 1908 – Victor Ambartsumian, Georgian-Armenian astrophysicist, astronomer, and academic (died 1996)
- 1910 – Josef Tal, Israeli pianist and composer (died 2008)
- 1910 – Joseph F. Enright, American submarine captain in the United States Navy
- 1911 – Syd Howe, Canadian ice hockey player (died 1976)
- 1912 – María de la Cruz, Chilean journalist and activist (died 1995)
- 1914 – Jack Cardiff, English director, cinematographer, and photographer (died 2009)
- 1916 – Rossano Brazzi, Italian actor (died 1994)
- 1916 – John Jacob Rhodes, American lawyer and politician (died 2003)
- 1917 – June Foray, American actress and voice artist (died 2017)
- 1917 – Phil Taylor, English footballer and manager (died 2012)
- 1917 – Francis Parker Yockey, American lawyer and philosopher (died 1960)
- 1918 – Johnny Mantz, American race car driver (died 1972)
- 1918 – Henry Wittenberg, American wrestler (died 2010)
- 1920 – Jack Warden, American actor (died 2006)
- 1922 – Hank Bagby, American saxophonist (died 1993)
- 1923 – Queen Anne of Romania (died 2016)
- 1923 – Al Quie, American politician, 35th Governor of Minnesota (died 2023)
- 1923 – Bertha Wilson, Scottish-Canadian lawyer and jurist, 60th Puisne Justice of the Supreme Court of Canada (died 2007)
- 1924 – J. D. Tippit, American police officer (died 1963)
- 1924 – Eloísa Mafalda, Brazilian actress (died 2018)
- 1925 – Dorothy Wedderburn, English economist and academic (died 2012)
- 1926 – Bud Greenspan, American director, producer, and screenwriter (died 2010)
- 1926 – Joe Kubert, American author and illustrator, founded The Kubert School (died 2012)
- 1927 – Phyllis Kirk, American actress (died 2006)
- 1927 – Muriel Turner, Baroness Turner of Camden, English politician (died 2018)
- 1929 – Nancy Littlefield, American director and producer (died 2007)
- 1930 – John Tolos, Greek-Canadian wrestler (died 2009)
- 1931 – Julio Grondona, Argentinian businessman (died 2014)
- 1932 – Nikolay Rukavishnikov, Russian physicist and astronaut (died 2002)
- 1933 – Bob Bennett, American soldier and politician (died 2016)
- 1933 – Robert Blake, American actor, producer, and screenwriter (died 2023)
- 1933 – Scotty Bowman, Canadian ice hockey player and coach
- 1933 – Leonid Kharitonov, Russian actor and singer (died 2017)
- 1933 – Charles Roach, Trinidadian-Canadian lawyer and activist (died 2012)
- 1933 – Jimmie Rodgers, American singer-songwriter and guitarist (died 2021)
- 1933 – Fred Willard, American actor and comedian (died 2020)
- 1935 – Peter Clarke, English cartoonist (died 2012)
- 1935 – John Spencer, English snooker player and sportscaster (died 2006)
- 1936 – Big Tom, Irish singer-songwriter and guitarist (died 2018)
- 1936 – Ruth Hesse, German mezzo-soprano (died 2024)
- 1937 – Ralph Backstrom, Canadian ice hockey player and coach (died 2021)
- 1937 – Ivy Matsepe-Casaburri, South African politician (died 2009)
- 1938 – Billy Robinson, English-American wrestler and trainer (died 2014)
- 1939 – Gerry Harvey, Australian businessman, co-founded Harvey Norman
- 1939 – Jorge Sampaio, Portuguese lawyer and politician, 18th President of Portugal (died 2021)
- 1940 – Frankie Avalon, American singer and actor
- 1942 – Şenes Erzik, Turkish businessman
- 1944 – Rocío Jurado, Spanish singer and actress (died 2006)
- 1944 – Charles L. Veach, American colonel, pilot, and astronaut (died 1995)
- 1945 – P. F. Sloan, American singer-songwriter and producer (died 2015)
- 1945 – John McAfee, British-American computer programmer and businessman, founded McAfee (died 2021)
- 1946 – Benjamín Brea, Spanish-Venezuelan saxophonist, clarinet player, and conductor (died 2014)
- 1946 – Nicholas Clay, English actor (died 2000)
- 1946 – Kelvin Coe, Australian ballet dancer (died 1992)
- 1946 – Gailard Sartain, American actor (died 2025)
- 1947 – Drew Gilpin Faust, American historian and academic
- 1947 – Giancarlo Minardi, Italian businessman, founded the Minardi Racing Team
- 1948 – Lynn Abbey, American computer programmer and author
- 1949 – Beth Grant, American actress
- 1949 – Kerry Livgren, American guitarist and songwriter
- 1949 – Mo Mowlam, English academic and politician, Minister for the Cabinet Office (died 2005)
- 1949 – Peter Shilton, English footballer and manager
- 1950 – Siobhan Davies, English dancer and choreographer
- 1950 – Vishnuvardhan, Indian actor (died 2009)
- 1950 – Chris Heister, Swedish politician, Governor of Stockholm County
- 1950 – Darryl Sittler, Canadian ice hockey player
- 1950 – Anna Deavere Smith, American actress and playwright
- 1951 – Ben Carson, American neurosurgeon, author, and politician
- 1951 – Dee Dee Ramone, American singer-songwriter and bass player (died 2002)
- 1951 – Marc Surer, Swiss racing driver and sportscaster
- 1952 – Giorgos Dimitrakopoulos, Greek politician
- 1952 – Rick Pitino, American basketball player and coach
- 1954 – Murtaza Bhutto, Pakistani politician (died 1996)
- 1954 – Takao Doi, Japanese engineer and astronaut
- 1954 – Dennis Johnson, American basketball player and coach (died 2007)
- 1954 – Steven Pinker, Canadian-American psychologist, linguist, and author
- 1954 – Tommy Tuberville, American football player, coach, and Senator
- 1955 – Keith Morris, American singer-songwriter
- 1956 – Chris Hedges, American journalist and author
- 1956 – Peter Šťastný, Slovak ice hockey player and politician
- 1956 – Anant Gadgil, Indian politician
- 1958 – John Aldridge, English-Irish footballer and manager
- 1958 – Jeff Bostic, American football player and commentator
- 1958 – Winston Davis, Vincentian cricketer
- 1958 – Derek Pringle, Kenyan-English cricketer and journalist
- 1959 – Mark Romanek, American director and screenwriter
- 1959 – Ryne Sandberg, American baseball player, coach, and manager (died 2025)
- 1960 – Stephen Flaherty, American composer
- 1960 – Carolyn Harris, British politician
- 1960 – Ian Lucas, English lawyer and politician
- 1960 – Blue Panther, Mexican wrestler
- 1961 – James Gandolfini, American actor and producer (died 2013)
- 1961 – Konstantin Kakanias, Greek-American painter and illustrator
- 1961 – Mark Olson, American singer-songwriter and guitarist
- 1962 – Joanne Catherall, English singer
- 1962 – John Fashanu, English footballer
- 1964 – Jens Henschel, German footballer
- 1964 – Marco Masini, Italian singer-songwriter
- 1964 – Holly Robinson Peete, American actress and singer
- 1964 – Steffen Peters, German-American equestrian
- 1966 – Tom Chorske, American ice hockey player and sportscaster
- 1967 – Tara Fitzgerald, English actress
- 1968 – Toni Kukoč, Croatian basketball player
- 1968 – Upendra Rao, Indian actor, director, and politician
- 1969 – Brad Beven, Australian triathlete
- 1969 – Cappadonna, American rapper
- 1970 – Darren Gough, English cricketer
- 1970 – Aisha Tyler, American actress, television host, and author
- 1971 – Lance Armstrong, American cyclist
- 1971 – Anna Netrebko, Russian-Austrian soprano and actress
- 1971 – Jada Pinkett Smith, American actress
- 1972 – Brigitte Becue, Belgian swimmer
- 1972 – Adam Cohen, Canadian singer-songwriter and guitarist
- 1972 – David Jefferies, English motorcycle racer (died 2003)
- 1972 – Iain Stewart, Scottish accountant and politician
- 1973 – Paul Brousseau, Canadian ice hockey player
- 1973 – Mário Jardel, Brazilian footballer
- 1973 – Aitor Karanka, Spanish footballer and manager
- 1973 – James Marsden, American actor
- 1973 – Louise Sauvage, Australian wheelchair racer
- 1973 – Mark Shuttleworth, South African-English businessman
- 1974 – Sol Campbell, English footballer and politician
- 1974 – Damon Jones, American football player and coach
- 1974 – Ticha Penicheiro, Portuguese-American basketball player and agent
- 1974 – Emily Rutherfurd, American actress
- 1974 – Travis Schuldt, American actor
- 1974 – Xzibit, American rapper, actor, and television host
- 1975 – Kanstantsin Lukashyk, Belarusian target shooter
- 1975 – Jason Sudeikis, American actor and comedian
- 1975 – Guillermo Vargas, Costa Rican photographer and painter
- 1976 – Sophina Brown, American actress
- 1976 – Gabriel Gervais, Canadian soccer player
- 1976 – Ronaldo, Brazilian footballer
- 1977 – Barrett Foa, American actor, singer, and dancer
- 1977 – Kieran West, English rower
- 1978 – Billy Eichner, American actor and comedian
- 1978 – Iain Lees-Galloway, New Zealand politician
- 1978 – Augustine Simo, Cameroonian footballer
- 1979 – Daniel Aranzubia, Spanish footballer
- 1979 – Robert Pruett, American criminal (died 2017)
- 1980 – Mickey Higham, English rugby league player
- 1980 – Avi Strool, Israeli footballer
- 1980 – Petri Virtanen, Finnish basketball player
- 1981 – Elke Hanel-Torsch, Austrian politician
- 1981 – Lasse Kukkonen, Finnish ice hockey player
- 1981 – Jennifer Tisdale, American actress and singer
- 1981 – Kristaps Valters, Latvian basketball player
- 1981 – Han Ye-seul, South Korean actress
- 1982 – Peter Budaj, Slovak ice hockey player
- 1982 – Alessandro Cibocchi, Italian footballer
- 1982 – Arvydas Eitutavičius, Lithuanian basketball player
- 1982 – Leono, Mexican wrestler
- 1982 – Alfredo Talavera, Mexican footballer
- 1984 – Anthony Gonzalez, American football player and politician
- 1984 – Travis Outlaw, American basketball player
- 1984 – Dizzee Rascal, British hip hop musician
- 1985 – Mirza Teletović, Bosnian basketball player
- 1987 – Marwin Hitz, Swiss footballer
- 1987 – Seiko Oomori, Japanese singer-songwriter
- 1989 – Serge Ibaka, Congolese-Spanish basketball player
- 1990 – Lewis Holtby, German footballer
- 1993 – Patrick Schwarzenegger, American-Austrian actor and model
- 1995 – Max Meyer, German footballer
- 1995 – Matt Targett, English footballer
- 1997 – Viktor Hovland, Norwegian professional golfer
- 1998 – Christian Pulisic, American soccer player
- 1998 – Conor Timmins, Canadian ice hockey player
- 2002 – Hugo Bueno, Spanish footballer
- 2003 – Aidan Gallagher, American actor and musician
- 2004 – Santiago Castro, Argentine footballer
- 2008 – Jackson Robert Scott, American actor

== Deaths ==
=== Pre-1600 ===
- 96 – Domitian, Roman emperor (born AD 51)
- 411 – Constantine III, Roman usurper
- 869 – Wenilo, Frankish archbishop
- 887 – Pietro I Candiano, doge of Venice (born 842)
- 893 – Zhang Xiong, Chinese warlord
- 958 – Liu Sheng, Chinese emperor (born 920)
- 1137 – Eric II, king of Denmark
- 1180 – Louis VII, king of France (born 1120)
- 1261 – Konrad von Hochstaden, archbishop of Cologne
- 1302 – Eudokia Palaiologina, empress of Trebizond (born c. 1265)
- 1345 – Andrew, Duke of Calabria (born 1327)
- 1361 – Louis V, duke of Bavaria (born 1315)
- 1385 – Balša II, ruler of Zeta
- 1443 – Lewis of Luxembourg, archbishop of Rouen
- 1598 – Toyotomi Hideyoshi, Japanese daimyō (born 1536)

=== 1601–1900 ===
- 1630 – Melchior Klesl, Austrian cardinal (born 1552)
- 1675 – Charles IV, Duke of Lorraine (born 1604)
- 1721 – Matthew Prior, English poet, politician, and diplomat, British Ambassador to France (born 1664)
- 1722 – André Dacier, French scholar and academic (born 1651)
- 1783 – Leonhard Euler, Swiss mathematician and physicist (born 1707)
- 1783 – Benjamin Kennicott, English theologian and scholar (born 1718)
- 1792 – August Gottlieb Spangenberg, German bishop and theologian (born 1704)
- 1812 – Safranbolulu Izzet Mehmet Pasha, Ottoman politician, 186th Grand Vizier of the Ottoman Empire (born 1743)
- 1830 – William Hazlitt, English philosopher, painter, and critic (born 1778)
- 1857 – Karol Kurpiński, Polish composer and conductor (born 1785)
- 1860 – Joseph Locke, English engineer and politician (born 1805)
- 1862 – Joseph K. Mansfield, American general (born 1803)
- 1872 – Charles XV of Sweden (born 1826)
- 1890 – Dion Boucicault, Irish-American actor and playwright (born 1820)
- 1896 – Hippolyte Fizeau, French physicist and academic (born 1819)

=== 1901–present ===
- 1905 – George MacDonald, Scottish minister, author, and poet (born 1824)
- 1909 – Grigore Tocilescu, Romanian archaeologist and historian (born 1850)
- 1911 – Pyotr Stolypin, Russian lawyer and politician, 3rd Prime Minister of Russia (born 1862)
- 1915 – Susan La Flesche Picotte, doctor, teacher, and social reformer, first Native American to earn a medical degree (born 1865)
- 1922 – Alfons Grotowski, Polish sanitary engineer (born 1833)
- 1924 – F. H. Bradley, English philosopher and author (born 1846)
- 1939 – Stanisław Ignacy Witkiewicz, Polish author, painter, and photographer (born 1885)
- 1941 – Fred Karno, English actor and screenwriter (born 1866)
- 1944 – Robert G. Cole, American colonel, Medal of Honor recipient (born 1915)
- 1945 – Volin, Russian anarchist intellectual (born 1882)
- 1949 – Frank Morgan, American actor (born 1890)
- 1951 – Gelett Burgess, American author and poet (born 1866)
- 1952 – Frances Alda, New Zealand-Australian soprano and actress (born 1879)
- 1953 – Charles de Tornaco, Belgian racing driver (born 1927)
- 1956 – Adélard Godbout, Canadian agronomist and politician, 15th Premier of Quebec (born 1892)
- 1958 – Olaf Gulbransson, Norwegian painter and illustrator (born 1873)
- 1959 – Benjamin Péret, French poet and journalist (born 1899)
- 1961 – Dag Hammarskjöld, Swedish economist and diplomat, 2nd Secretary-General of the United Nations, Nobel Prize laureate (born 1905)
- 1962 – Therese Neumann, German mystic (born 1898)
- 1964 – Seán O'Casey, Irish dramatist and memoirist (born 1880)
- 1967 – John Cockcroft, English physicist and academic, Nobel Prize laureate (born 1897)
- 1968 – Franchot Tone, American actor, singer, and producer (born 1905)
- 1970 – Jimi Hendrix, American singer-songwriter, guitarist, and producer (born 1942)
- 1974 – Amanat Ali Khan, Pakistani classical singer (born 1922)
- 1975 – Fairfield Porter, American painter and critic (born 1907)
- 1977 – Paul Bernays, English-Swiss mathematician and philosopher (born 1888)
- 1980 – Katherine Anne Porter, American short story writer, novelist, and essayist (born 1890)
- 1987 – Américo Tomás, Portuguese admiral and politician, 14th President of Portugal (born 1894)
- 1988 – Alan Watt, Australian public servant and diplomat, Australian Ambassador to Japan (born 1901)
- 1992 – Mohammad Hidayatullah, Indian lawyer, judge, and politician, 6th Vice President of India (born 1905)
- 1997 – Jimmy Witherspoon, American singer (born 1920)
- 1998 – Charlie Foxx, American singer and guitarist (Inez and Charlie Foxx) (born 1939)
- 2001 – Ernie Coombs, American-Canadian television host (born 1927)
- 2002 – Bob Hayes, American sprinter and football player (born 1942)
- 2002 – Mauro Ramos, Brazilian footballer and manager (born 1930)
- 2002 – Margita Stefanović, Serbian keyboard player (born 1959)
- 2003 – Emil Fackenheim, German rabbi and philosopher (born 1916)
- 2003 – Bob Mitchell, English educator and politician (born 1927)
- 2004 – Norman Cantor, Canadian-American historian and educator (born 1929)
- 2004 – Russ Meyer, American director, producer, and screenwriter (born 1922)
- 2005 – Michael Park, English racing driver (born 1966)
- 2005 – Clint C. Wilson, Sr., American cartoonist (born 1914)
- 2006 – Edward J. King, American football player, lawyer, and politician, 66th Governor of Massachusetts (born 1925)
- 2007 – Pepsi Tate, Welsh bass player and producer (born 1965)
- 2008 – Leo de Berardinis, Italian actor and director (born 1940)
- 2008 – Mauricio Kagel, Argentinian-German composer and educator (born 1931)
- 2008 – Ron Lancaster, American-Canadian football player and coach (born 1938)
- 2011 – Jamey Rodemeyer, American teenage activist (born 1997)
- 2012 – Santiago Carrillo, Spanish theorist and politician (born 1915)
- 2012 – Haim Hefer, Polish-Israeli songwriter and poet (born 1925)
- 2012 – Jack Kralick, American baseball player (born 1935)
- 2012 – Steve Sabol, American director and producer, co-founded NFL Films (born 1942)
- 2013 – Veliyam Bharghavan, Indian politician (born 1928)
- 2013 – Lindsay Cooper, English composer, bassoon and oboe player (born 1951)
- 2013 – Arthur Lamothe, French-Canadian director, producer, and screenwriter (born 1928)
- 2013 – Ken Norton, American boxer (born 1943)
- 2013 – Marcel Reich-Ranicki, Polish-German author and critic (born 1920)
- 2013 – Richard C. Sarafian, American actor, director, and screenwriter (born 1930)
- 2014 – Milan Marcetta, Canadian ice hockey player (born 1936)
- 2014 – Earl Ross, Canadian racing driver (born 1941)
- 2014 – Hirofumi Uzawa, Japanese economist and academic (born 1928)
- 2014 – Kenny Wheeler, Canadian-English trumpet player and composer (born 1930)
- 2015 – Eduardo Bonvallet, Chilean footballer and manager (born 1955)
- 2015 – James R. Houck, American astrophysicist and academic (born 1940)
- 2015 – Mario Benjamín Menéndez, Argentinian general and politician (born 1930)
- 2017 – Afzal Ahsan Randhawa, Pakistani writer, poet, translator and playwright (born 1937)
- 2020 – Ruth Bader Ginsburg, United States Supreme Court justice (born 1933)
- 2021 – Jolidee Matongo, South African politician, 97th Mayor of Johannesburg (born 1975)
- 2021 – Chris Anker Sørensen, Danish road bicycle racer (born 1984)
- 2023 – Brereton C. Jones, American politician, 58th Governor of Kentucky (born 1939)
- 2024 – Kesaria Abramidze, Georgian blogger, actress and model (born 1987)
- 2024 – Nick Gravenites, American singer-songwriter (born 1938)
- 2024 – Salvatore Schillaci, Italian footballer (born 1964)
- 2026 – Stephanie Cole, English actress (born 1941)
- 2026 – Richard Harrison, American actor (born 1936)

== Holidays and observances ==
- Christian feast day:
  - Ariadne of Phrygia
  - Constantius (Theban Legion)
  - Edward Bouverie Pusey (Episcopal Church)
  - Eustorgius I
  - Joseph of Cupertino
  - Józef Kut
  - Methodius of Olympus
  - Richardis
  - September 18 (Eastern Orthodox liturgics)
- Day of National Music (Azerbaijan)
- Island Language Day (Okinawa Prefecture, Japan)
- National Day or Dieciocho (Chile)
- National HIV/AIDS and Aging Awareness Day (United States)
- Navy Day (Croatia)
- World Water Monitoring Day
