= Louise Lyngh Bjerregaard =

Danish fashion designer

- Born: Copenhagen, Denmark
- Education: Scandinavian Academy of Fashion Design
- Occupation: Fashion designer
- Website: louiselynghbjerregaard.net

Louise Lyngh Bjerregaard is a fashion designer based in Paris known for blurring the boundaries between couture and ready-to-wear.

== Biography ==
Bjerregaard was born in Copenhagen, the youngest child in her family. She studied tailoring at the Scandinavian Academy of Fashion Design in Copenhagen and interned with designers Dennis Lyngsø, Anne Sofie Madsen, Asger Juel Larsen and Mike Eckhaus at Eckhaus Latta. She started out in fashion by working on a project with Lady Gaga and in 2015 she attended a course on knitwear at Central Saint Martins in London.

Bjerregaard launched her namesake womanswear brand in 2019.

Her work has been featured at a number of institutions, including Maison du Danemark, the National Gallery of Denmark, and Moderna Museet Malmö.

‍She is best known for her textile expertise and artistic knitwear, although in an interview with Dazed, Bjerregaard stated that she "felt the need to break out of the knitwear label that’s been put on her name", asserting that her brand was not a knitwear label. Her brand is also known for its zero-waste policy and sustainability.

Bjerregaard had her runway debut in 2021 during Couture Week in Paris with supermodel May Andersen walking the show. A few months later she debuted digital at Copenhagen Fashion Week in August 2021. Earlier that year, she was shortlisted as finalist at the 2021 Zalando Sustainability Awards and the 2021 Magasin du Nord Fashion Prize. In March 2022 Bjerregaard debuted her first ready-to-wear collection with Ella Snyder walking the runway. Same year she was nominated as "Name of the Year" at the ELLE Awards. In February 2023 she debuted her first artisanal ready-to-wear collection during Paris Fashion Week and caused an intentional stir with people not being able to photograph the collection. Included in her cast was BoF500 model Aweng Ade-Chuol.
