= Studio Berçot =

Fashion school based in Paris, France

Coordinates: 48.8738°N 2.3515°E

Studio Berçot was a private training fashion design institute, established in 1954, and based in Paris. In the summer of 2023, it stopped operating independently and was integrated into the Paris College of Art.

== History ==
Suzanne Berçot, a painter and fashion illustrator, created the Cours Berçot in 1954 on the advice of her colleagues at Le Jardin des Modes. Drawing was a rigorous and necessary discipline in the heyday of haute couture, both for designing and representing the garment. After several years of close collaboration, in 1971, Madame Berçot entrusted the management of the establishment to Marie Rucki, a former student who was active in the fashion world. She renamed it Studio Berçot. The decline of haute couture and the rise of ready-to-wear clothes during the 1970s developed a large number of new professional activities in fashion. Rucki being highly aware of the constant changes in trends, organized the curriculum to match the expansion of fashion design. Studio Berçot became a key pool of talent dedicated to the designers/creators of the 1980s, to the artistic directors in large luxury houses of the 1990s, and to the fashion accessory market in the 2000s when mass retailing internationalized the industry.

== Curriculum ==
Reflecting the environment for which it prepares its students, Studio Berço's training on a three-year period.

=== Year 1 ===
By experimenting with the basics of artistic creation and a selection of techniques which are representative of the fashion industry, the first year tests students' capacity to position themselves. At the end of the year, a jury of professors assesses students' aptitude to continue with the program.

=== Year 2 ===
Students are individually mentored in a fashion project. In conjunction with collections developed in close collaboration with teachers and external instructors, over time a personal dossier is developed which is a future professional canvassing tool.

==== Fashion show ====
The fashion show is considered to be an emblematic event in fashion and a definitive way of learning to carry a project to the end. Consequently, a year-end fashion show is usually organized, widely followed by professionals.

==== Twinning ====
Each year, two students are selected to further their studies at the Academy of Arts University in San Francisco.

=== Year 3 ===
Depending on students' skills evaluations at the completion of Year 1 and Year 2, internships are found within the Studio Berçot network. During the final year, students receive personalized mentoring and support from teachers while learning to be a professional.

== Subjects taught ==
- Cultural: history of art and costumes, visits to museums and exhibitions, film screenings
- Research: nude drawing, fashion sketches, colors, trends
- Techniques: the study of volumes in clothes (cutting, sewing), prototyping (pattern design), embellishment of materials, pattern and textile design

Studio Berçot has no grading system, preferring a weekly assessment of each individual in a group in the form of rigorous evaluations. The Studio Berçot certificate is recognized by the French government and is approved by the Rectorate of Paris.

== Registration ==
Applicants are seen individually with their personal dossier. The interview enables professors to examine future students' positioning and personality, validating their registration. Considering the maturity required for the program, it is recommended that applicants hold a baccalaureate degree (or foreign equivalent). All classes are taught in French and a very good knowledge of oral French is essential.

== Alumni with their own business ==
Alan Alexander Kaleekal, Yacine Aouadi, Karine Arabian, Shinishiro Arakawa, Catherine Baba, Charlotte Balme (Yvonne Yvonne), Aymeric Bergada du Cadet, Alexandra Bernard, Camille Bidault-Waddington, Laurene Bouaziz (Tiger Sushi), Stella Cadente, Carlotta, William Carnimolla, Laurence Chauvin-Buthaud (Laurenceairline), Charlotte Chesnais, Caroline Christiansson, Thierry Colson, Marie Credou, Vincent Darré, Valérie Delafosse, Ligia Dias, Gordana Dimitijevic, James Dignan, Babeth Djian, Erotokritos, Yasmine Eslami, Nicole Farhi, Samuel François, Olivier Guillemin, Sosthen Hennekam, Sandie Jancovek, Dauphine de Jerphanion, Thierry Journo (Idly), Yoshiko Kajitani (Yoshiko Création), Konstantin Kakanias, Shirley Kurata, Lolita Lempicka, Véronique Leroy, Coralie Marabelle, Isabel Marant, Fred Marzo, Laurent Mercier (Lola), Lou Menais (Jour-Ne), Marion Meyer, Yasu Michino, Yvan Mispelaere, Benoit Missolin, Massimiliano Modesti, Roland Mouret, Jun Nakamoto, Robert Normand, Jun Okamoto, Shun Okubo, Catherine Ormen, Angela Papadopoulos-Fortune, Delphine-Charlotte Parmentier, Sébastien Peigne, Dorothée Perret, Chloé Perrin (Perrin), Antoine Platteau, Florian Pretet, Katja Rahlwes, Natacha Ramsay-Levi, Priscilla Royer (Pièce d'anarchive), François Sagat, Cédric Saint-André Perrin, Sherazed (Shera Kerienski), Shourouk, Vanessa Seward, Marie Seznec-Martinez, Sheila Single, Martine Sitbon, Sophie Theallet, Anne-Sophie Thomas, Alix Thomsen, Sylvia Toledano, Eri Utsugi (Frapbois), Nadège Vanhee-Cybulsky, Quentin Véron, Lucien Wang, Marie Welte (Maison Labiche), Yazbukey, Emmanuelle Youchnovsky, and Gaspard Yurkievich

=== Professional Community ===
A.P.C., Acné Studios, AD, Alaia, Alexandre Vauthier, Ami, Antidote, Antik Batik, Baby Dior, Balenciaga, Balmain, Bo De Bo, Bonpoint, Carven, Catherine Miran, Céline, Chanel, Chloé, Citizen K, Comme des Garçons, Courrèges, CR Fashion Book, Derek Lam, Diane von Fürstenberg, Dior, Double Magazine, Elle, Ères, Erik Halley, Erotokritos, Galeries Lafayette, Givenchy, Grazia, Guy Laroche, Haider Ackermann, Haut et Court, Hermès, Iceberg, Inès de La Fressange, Isabel Marant, J. Mendel, Jacadi, Jalouse, Jean Paul Gaultier (Gaultier Paris), John Galliano, Karla Otto, Kenzo, Kenzo Takada, Lalala Productions, Lancel, Lanvin, Laurence Dacade, Le Bon Marché, Le Printemps, Louis Vuitton, Lucien Pages, M6, Maje, Maison Hamon, Maison Margiela, Maison Michel, Maison Rabih Kayrouz, Malhia Kent, Marc Jacobs, Marie Claire, Mellow Yellow, Merci, Michelle Montagne, Michino, Milk, Montex, Moschino, Nelly Rodi, Nicholas Kirkwood, Nina Ricci, Numéro, Paco Rabanne, Paule Ka, Peclers Paris, PR Consulting, Princesse tam.tam, Public Image PR, Pucci, Quicksilver, Repossi, Rick Owens, Robert Clergerie, Roger Vivier, Saint Laurent Paris, Sergent Major, Sonia Rykiel, Sœur, Swarovski, The Row, Vanessa Seward, Undercover, Véronique Leroy, Vivienne Westwood, Vogue Hommes, Vogue Italia, Vogue Paris, WAD, Wooyoungmi, Wowo, Zac Posen, and Zara

== Quotes ==
"Fashion is a form of expression." Marie Rucki

"Today everything is going so fast that you have to reach the goal at the same time as the best of them". Rucki

"You don't need to come to the school. What I can teach you, you already know." Rucki to Christian Lacroix
