= Katja Rahlwes =

German photographer

- Born: 1967 (age 58–59); Frankfurt, West Germany
- Education: Studio Berçot (fashion design)
- Occupation: Fashion photographer

Katja Rahlwes (born 1967, Frankfurt, Germany) is a German fashion photographer, based in Paris.

== Biography ==
Katja Rahlwes born in Frankfurt Germany (3 December 1967) is a fine-Art and fashion photographer, moved to Paris in 1987 to study fashion design at Studio Berçot, Paris.

In 1995–2004, Rahlwes set out for a career as a freelance fashion stylist. She met Elein Fleiss and Olivier Zahm, co-founders and publishers of Purple Prose, later called Purple fashion, in 1996. Rahlwes has been collaborating with Purple ever since and took part of a new movement of visual language in the publication world. In 1998–2001, Rahlwes became chief-fashion editor and photo-editor at BIBA, a major market fashion magazine in Paris.

Throughout those years she would live a parallel life as a professional stylist and photographer. 2003 she chose photography over her styling career.

== Commercial work ==
Her work can be seen in the magazines Vogue Paris, Vogue Nippon, Vogue US, Self Service, Interview, Purple fashion, i-D, Pin Up, BUTT Magazine, New York (magazine).

She has produced photographs for brands such as Gucci, Céline, Miu Miu, Chloé, A.P.C., Maison Martin Margiela, Levi's and others.

== Exhibitions ==
- "Unknown Female Photographer", solo show at Galerie fuer Moderne Fotografie Berlin, Germany, September 2015
- UltraMegalore, Group exhibition curated by Hannelore Knuts at Modemuseum Hasselt, Belgium, 2010
- Black Beauty, curated by Vogue Paris at Le Printemps, Paris, France, 2008
- RxART, Benefit Auction at Phillips de Pury & Company, New York, USA, 2007
- Maison Martin Margiela, Group exhibition, Paris, France, 2007
- Concrete Castle, Group Exhibition at Confort Moderne, Poitier, France, 2007
- 2001/2010:les années fatales, Group Exhibition for Céline & Libération Style, Paris, France, 2004
- Indigestible Correctness, Group Exhibition at Participant Inc, New York, USA, 2004
- Violence the True Way, Group Exhibition at Peter Kilchmann Gallery, Zurich, Switzerland, 2003

== Books ==
- "Full Moon", Supplement Book edition by PurpleFashionMagazine Issue 16 F:W 2011/2012
- Ezra Petronio and Suzanne Koller: Selected Works, Subjective Inventory, JRP|Ringier, 2008, ISBN 978-3-905829-54-9
- Purple Anthology, Rizzoli, 2008, ISBN 978-0-8478-3020-6
- Butt Book, Taschen, 2006, ISBN 978-3-8228-3021-5
