= Shannon Rusbuldt =

American model (born 1985)

Shannon Rusbuldt (born February 14, 1985) is an American model.

== Modeling career ==
Rusbuldt is an editorial and runway model based in Los Angeles. Soon after moving to New York from Alexandria, Virginia, she was offered a contract from Elite Model Management that launched her fashion career. Rusbuldt has walked the runway for designers such as Giorgio Armani, Tommy Hilfiger, Tory Burch, Sophie Theallet. She has appeared in magazines such asVogue, Elle, Cosmopolitan, Zink, Fitness and InStyle.

Rusbuldt plays the water goddess of death in The History Channel's series, Vikings.

== Charity work ==
Rusbuldt works with the charities Project Sunshine, Fashion Delivers, and the National MS Society. Currently, she is spearheading a large-scale fashion charity event in October for the National MS Society in Washington, DC.
