= Habacuc =

Habacuc may refer to:

- Habakkuk, a prophet in the Hebrew Bible
- Guillermo Vargas (born 1975), also known as Habacuc, Costa Rican artist
