= Vanessa Seward =

French fashion designer

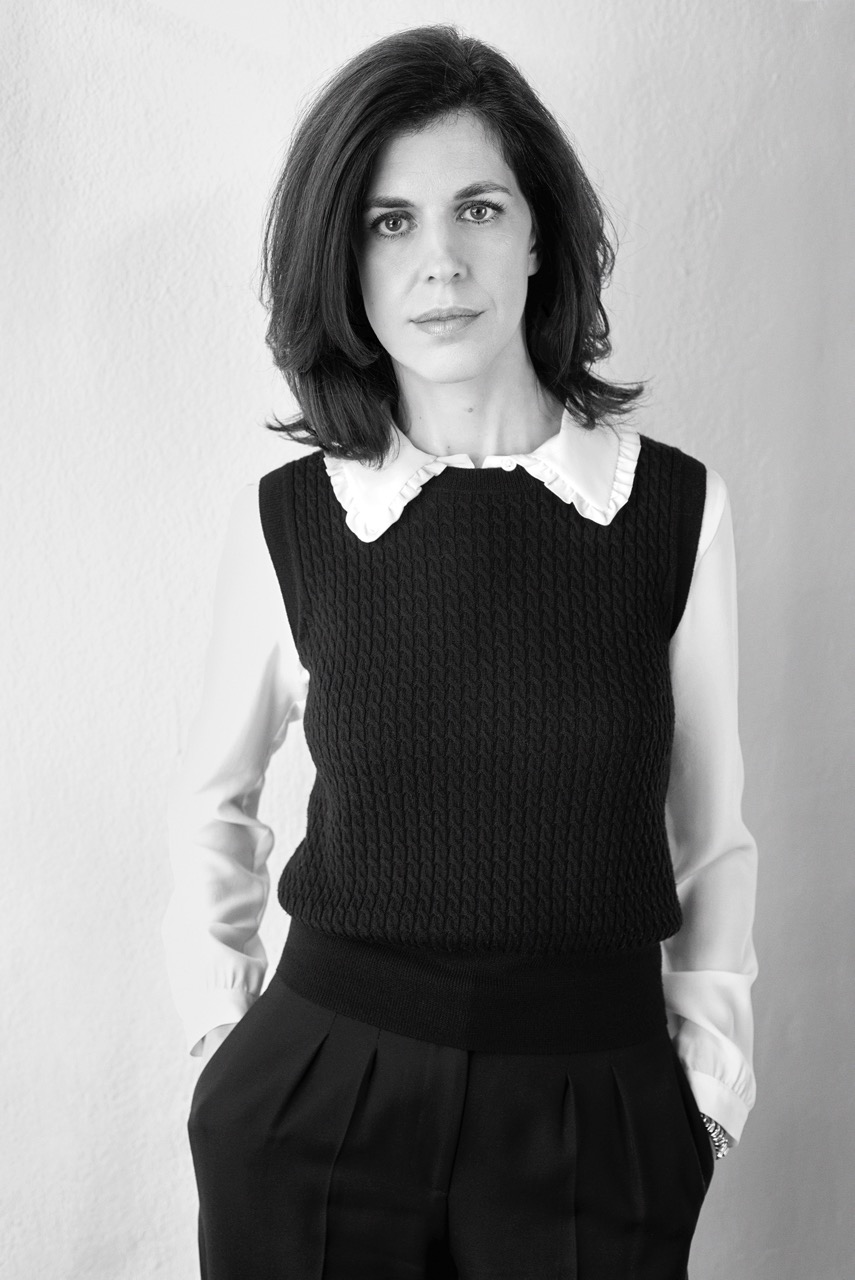
- Vanessa Seward in 2016
- Born: 1969 (age 55–56); Argentina
- Occupation: Fashion designer
- Notable work: Chanel, accessory designer Swarovski, jewellery designer

Vanessa Seward is a French fashion designer.

== Early life and education ==
Seward was born in Argentina in 1969, where her father was an Argentine diplomat who worked as an economic advisor. She grew up in London before moving to Paris at age 12 with her mother. She studied at Studio Berçot.

== Career ==
=== Early career ===
From 1991, Seward worked for nine years as an accessory designer for Chanel, then with Tom Ford at Yves Saint Laurent before becoming second-in-command at Loris Azzaro in 2002. Following Azzaro's death in 2003, Seward became artistic director of his fashion house. There, she dressed Natalie Portman, Nicole Kidman, Kristen Stewart and Marisa Berenson among others. She left Azzaro in 2011, joining Jean Touitou at A.P.C. to launch a capsule ready-to-wear collection with the label.

In 2012, Seward designed a collection of jewellery for Swarovski. She also designed the costumes for the musical "Les Parapluies du Cherbourg" at Théâtre du Châtelet.

=== Vanessa Seward ===
In 2014, Vanessa Seward launched her own label with the support of A.P.C. and its founder, Jean Touitou. She presented her first runway show during Paris Fashion Week at the Mona Bismarck American Center for Art and Culture in Fall/Winter 2015.

The high-end ready-to-wear line aims to make its vision of 1970s-inspired luxury accessible, redefining and exacerbating classic femininity.

"The 1970s fascinate me because they never get old," Seward told L'Express. "Women were at once strong and sensual, elegant without being trendy. This equilibrium has never been attained since."

What was once scoffed at as bourgeois should once again become desirable. For example, Seward offers jeans embroidered with the client's name.

Two Vanessa Seward boutiques opened in Paris in 2015: the first at 10 Rue d'Alger in the 1st arrondissement de Paris, another at 7 Boulevard des Filles-du-Calvaire, as well as an online shop. A third storefront opened in 2016 at 171 Boulevard Saint-Germain. In early 2017, a fourth store opened its doors in London. All stores were designed by architect Laurent Deroo.

== Personal life ==
Vanessa Seward is married to Corsican-born musician, composer, record producer, and director, Bertrand Burgalat, founder of the record label Tricatel. He assists with the sound production of the brand.

== See also ==
- List of fashion designers
