= Alshair Fiyaz =

Belgian entrepreneur

- Born: 1972 (age 53–54)
- Occupations: Businessman; Private equity investor
- Known for: owner of Polo Club de Saint-Tropez-Haras de Gassin

Alshair Fiyaz is a Belgian entrepreneur and investor of Pakistani origin. He is the founder of the investment company ALFI investments and the owner of Polo Club de Saint-Tropez-Haras de Gassin.

== Biography ==
Fiyaz born in 1972 in Belgium to a Pakistani businessman father.

Alshair Fiyaz is the founder of ALFI Investments, active in the shipping and financial services business. He is also a Polo player and became the owner of the F Polo Team in 2006. He became the owner of Polo Club de Saint-Tropez-Haras de Gassin in 2014.

In 2009, Fiyaz, under the name Solstra Holding, bought Magasin du Nord, an upmarket Danish department store chain, in a joint venture with Straumur Investment Bank. He made a bid to acquire A-Tec's Montanwerke Brixlegg unit in 2011, though he pulled out later. In 2012, Alshair's Solstra Holding bid for the fashion chain Peacocks but it had been sold to the Edinburgh Woollen Mill Group. He purchased a major stake in Bella Center and Bella Sky Hotel in Copenhagen and the Marriott Hotel in 2014 through the Solstra Capital Partners.

In 2020, Fiyaz partnered with the city of Copenhagen to develop the district Bellakvarter to be fully powered by green energy.

=== FCA vs Fabiana Abdel-Malek & Walid Choucair trial ===
Fiyaz was mentioned during the Financial Conduct Authority (FCA) vs Fabiana Abdel-Malek and Walid Choucair insider dealing trial that took place in 2018 and 2019. Abdel-Malek was employed as a senior compliance officer by the investment bank UBS AG in their London office and used her position to identify inside information which she passed to her family friend Choucair, an experienced day trader of financial securities, using pay-as-you-go mobile telephones. The pair were sentenced to 3 years imprisonment each.

During the trial, Walid Choucair alleged in his testimony that he obtained trading tips from several traders he knew including Alshair Fiyaz and not from Fabiana Abdel-Malek. In his ruling, Lord Justice Nigel Davis of the Criminal Court of Appeal said of the defendants: "The jury, having evaluated their evidence, did not believe them. The jury were made sure, on all the evidence, that the counts of insider trading on the indictment had been proved". Fabiana Abdel-Malek and Walid Choucair lodged an application to the Court of Appeal in 2020, which was rejected due to insufficient grounds. Their convictions were upheld.

=== Philanthropy ===
Fiyaz has contributed to numerous charitable projects over the years. The criteria were to encourage social mobility regardless of international borders and other racial, religious, and cultural restrictions, to support the development of underprivileged people, communities and biodiversity. For instance, the initiatives sponsored both Jewish orphanages in Pinsk, Belarus, and Palestinian refugee camps in Lebanon.

Fiyaz provided aid for the emergency distribution of winter shelter for 1,600 families suffering from the destruction of their homes by the Kashmir earthquake in 2005.

In 2017, Fiyaz founded the non-profit ALFI Foundation. The foundation has supported the New York-based Face-to-Face Project, which fosters comprehensive organic farming methods to protect the environment and supports community service projects to promote youth development in Malawi.

The ALFI Foundation is a major supporter of UNICEF's efforts to eliminate polio in Pakistan.

== See also ==
- Polo Club de Saint-Tropez-Haras de Gassin
