= Polo Club de Saint-Tropez-Haras de Gassin =

Polo club in Gassin, France

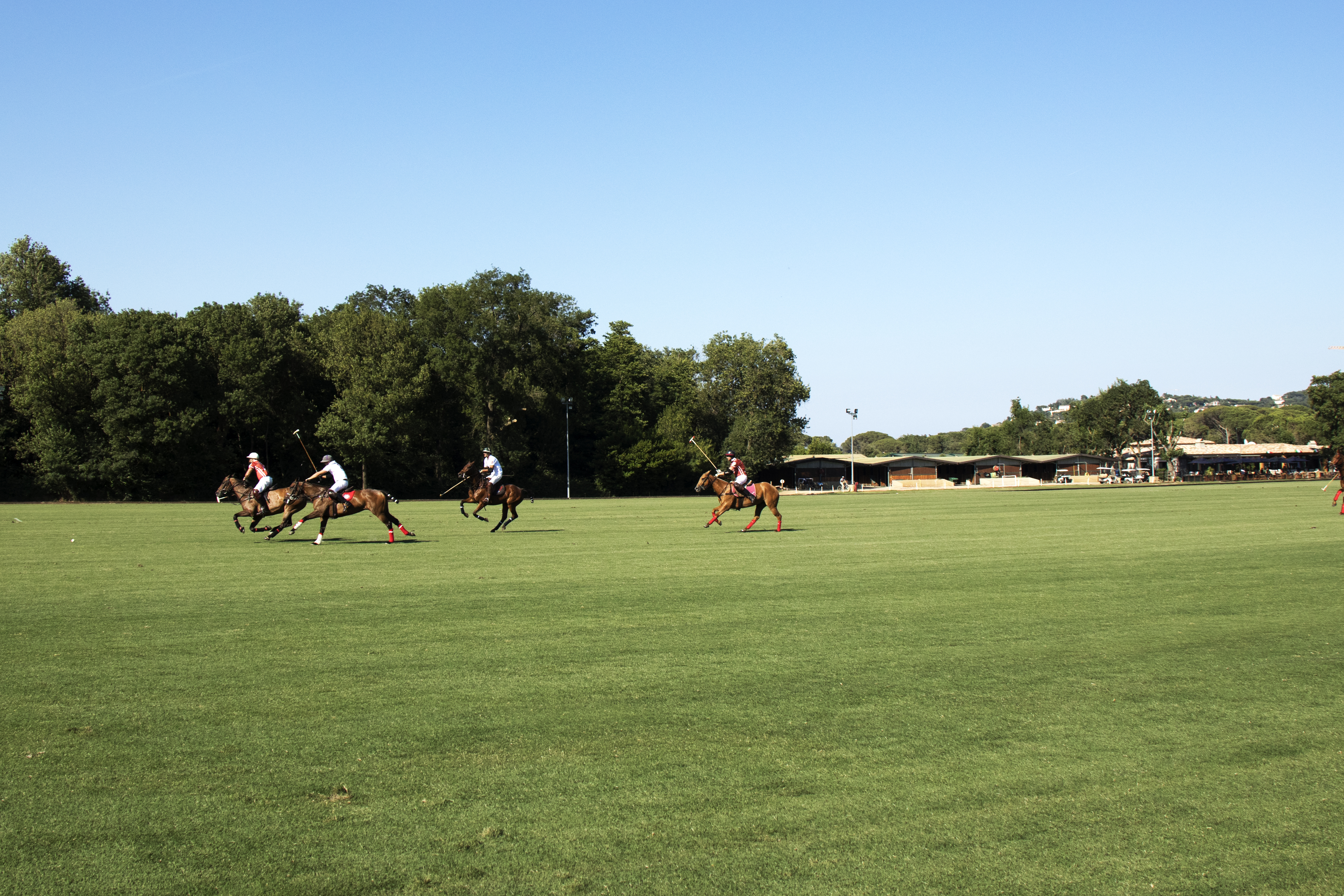
- Interactive map of Polo Club de Saint-Tropez-Haras de Gassin
- Location: 1999 route du Bourrian; Gassin; France
- Coordinates: 43°15′07″N 6°34′51″E
- Capacity: Main Stadium - 100; The Restaurant - 120
- Surface: Natural Grass
- Acreage: 250

Construction
- Opened: 1980 for the Haras de Gassin; 1997 for the Polo Club de Saint-Tropez

Website
- www.polo-st-tropez.com

The Polo Club de Saint-Tropez-Haras de Gassin is a polo facility in Gassin, France. The club includes four natural grass polo fields for high-goal competition.

== Location ==
The Polo Resort & Country Club is located within 100 hectares of secure private grounds at 1999, route du Bourrian, Gassin, France, near Saint-Tropez.

== History ==
The Haras de Gassin was founded in 1980 and the Polo Club de Saint-Tropez in 1997 by Corinne Schuler.

The Pakistani businessman Alshair Fiyaz became the only shareholder of the Haras de Gassin and the Polo Club.

== Amenities ==
The club has four polo fields, a helipad, Argentinian restaurant, gymnasium with qualified coach, 30m heated outdoor pool open all year round, tennis and padel court, sauna, hammam, cryotherapy room, and several spa rooms.

The restaurant is named POLO1999. The chef is Israeli Shahar Dahan, who has been a personal chef to several Hollywood movie stars.

The Pavilion is located across from the main field and is used for special functions, including Sunday Brunch and Polo.

== High-goal polo tournaments ==
- Côte d'Azur Cup (15-18 goals)
- Open du Soleil (15-18 goals)
