= Tonsure (brand) =

Danish men's clothing brand

- Company type: Clothing, sunglasses
- Industry: Fashion
- Founded: 2013
- Headquarters: Copenhagen, Denmark
- Products: Clothing
- Website: Official website

Tonsure is a men's wear brand based out of Copenhagen, Denmark.

== History ==
Tonsure was founded by Malte Flagstad in 2013. The brand won the Danish Design Talent Award in 2015 and the international Woolmark Prize in the men's wear category in 2017.

== Headquarters ==
The company is based in the Christians Plejehus complex at Store Kongensgade 108B in central Copenhagen. The building is a former home for army veterans and was now heritage listed.

== Distribution ==
The company operates a web store and is also sold through the following fashion stores:

=== Australia ===
Brisbane

- Contra

=== China ===
Hong Kong

- Kapok

=== Denmark ===
Copenhagen

- Storm
- LOT #29
- Samsøe & Samsøe, Købmagergade

Zealand

- Louisiana, Humlebæk
- Mr. Harris, Kongens Lyngby
- Who Dresses Who, Køge
- Mr. Team, Holbæk
- Illum, Roskilde
- Studio 12, Næstved

Fyn

- Dr. Adam's, Odense
- Hyper, Svendborg

Jutland

- Kul & Koks, Kolding
- Butler, Aalborg
- Co Exist, Esbjerg
- Homme Femme Store, Horsens
- Poul Iversen, Vejle

=== Germany ===
Berlin

- BAERCK

Mannheim

- Dipol

=== Japan ===
Fukuoka

- Hues
- Birthday

Kagawa

- Tronica

Kumamoto

- Idiome

Kyoto

- Prophet

Hokkaido

- Modest

Nagoya

- L.H.P.
- Goldkiss
- Unlimited

Tokyo

- Beams International Gallery
- 1LDK
- Links
- Ships
- Maidens shop

Yamagayta

- Gea

=== Iceland ===
Reykjavík

- GK Reykjavík

=== Sweden ===
Stockholm

- Aplace Norrlandsgatan
- Aplace Brunogallerian

Malmö

- Aplace

=== United Kingdom ===
London

- AcerAnderson.com
