= Magasin du Nord =

Danish chain of department stores

Coordinates: 55.6793°N 12.5847°E

Magasin

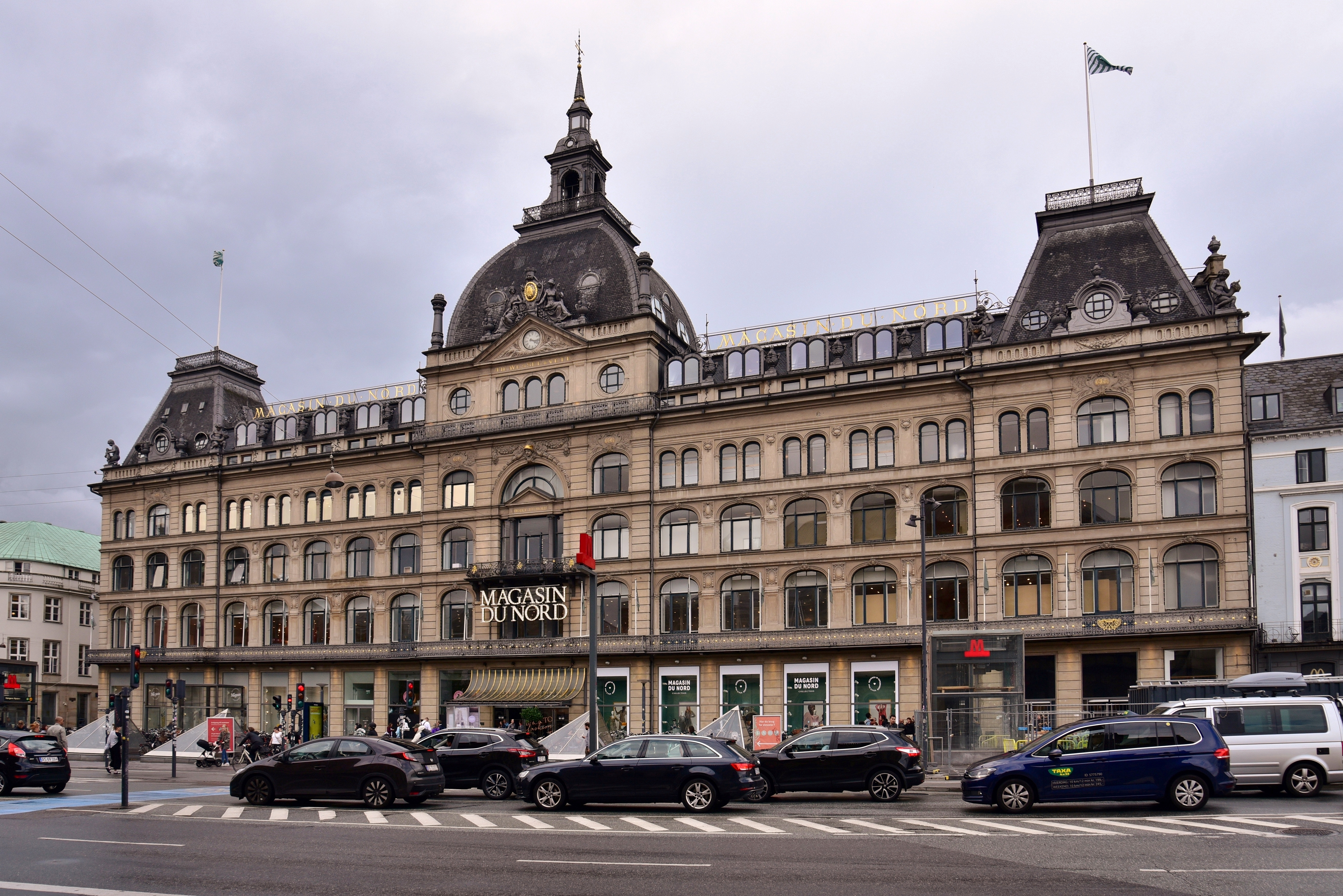
- Magasin du Nord, Copenhagen
- Company type: Subsidiary
- Industry: Retail
- Founded: 1868, Aarhus, Denmark
- Founders: Theodor Wessel & Emil Vett
- Headquarters: Copenhagen, Denmark
- Parent: Peek & Cloppenburg Düsseldorf (since 2021)
- Website: www.magasin.dk

Magasin is a Danish chain of department stores. It has seven department stores with its flagship store located on Kongens Nytorv in Copenhagen. The company is a subsidiary of the German department store retailer Peek & Cloppenburg Düsseldorf, Magasin du Nord has been a founder and remained a member of the International Association of Department Stores since 1928.

== History ==
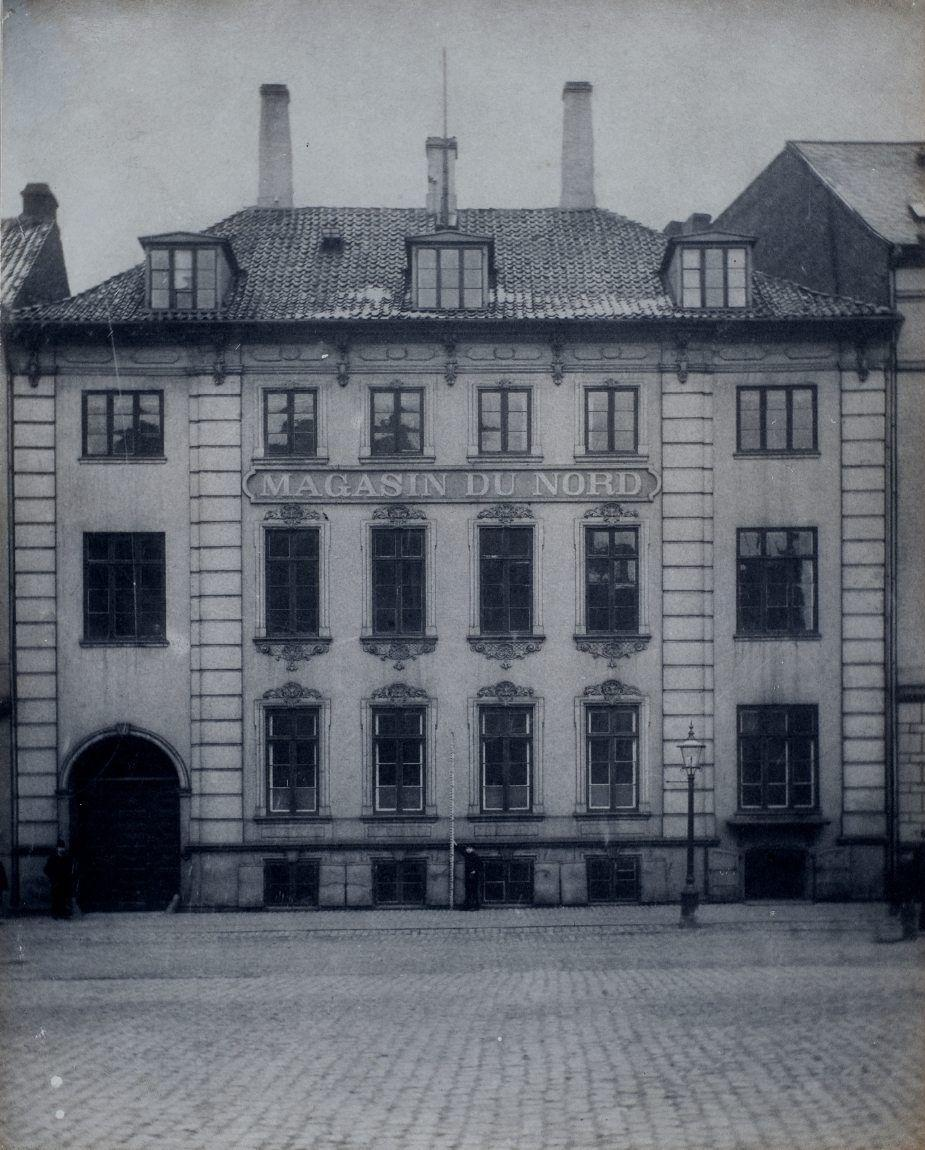
Magasin du Nord on Kongens Nytorv in 1893

The company traces its roots back to 1868 when Theodor Wessel and Emil Vett opened a draper's shop in Aarhus under the name Emil Vett & Co. It was an immediate success and in 1871 moved to Immervad where the Aarhus store is still located.

In 1870 the company opened a shop in Copenhagen in rented space in the fashionable Hotel du Nord on Kongens Nytorv where Hans Christian Andersen had boarded from 1838 until 1847. The shop occupied an ever larger part of the hotel and the company adopted the name Magasin du Nord after it in 1879. In 1876 the two owners also founded a textile manufactury in Nørrebro, Vett, Wessel & Fiala, which later moved to Østerbro where it also produced textiles for furniture. The factory has now been demolished.

By 1889, Magasin du Nord had taken over the entire hotel. It was demolished in 1893 together with a neighbouring building and the current department store building was completed the following year in a French Renaissance Revival style to designs by the architects Henri Glæsel and Albert Jensen. The executive architect was Olaus Mynster.

The company opened branches throughout Denmark. In 1892, it had 50 stores all over the country and by 1906 the number had grown to 98. In 1911 the Th. Wessel & Vett branch followed in Malmö. The company was listed on the Copenhagen Stock Exchange in 1952 and the strategy was changed to having fewer, large department stores. In the winter of 1954, toy buyer Troels Petersen advised Gotfred Kirk Kristiansen from Lego Group that he gather the "cut-and-dried" individual toys they had been making into a larger "play system".

Magasin du Nord took over its competitor Illum in 1991 but it was sold to Merrill Lynch in 2003. The company was controlled by Emil Vett's until the mid-1990s. To reduce its debts after a period with economic difficulties, the company chose to part with its buildings at Kongens Nytorv, in Lyngby and in Aalborg in a sale and lease back scheme.

In 2004, Magasin du Nord was sold to an Icelandic consortium headed by Baugur Group. Baugur went insolvent in Iceland and entered administration in the United Kingdom in 2009, which ceded Magasin du Nord to Straumur Investment Bank which subsequently entered into a joint venture with Pakistani businessman Alshair Fiyaz under the name Solstra Holding, which bought back what had previously been sold.

Magasin du Nord was acquired by Debenhams in November 2009 while Solstra kept the 20% share of Illum and all properties. In May 2010, Fiyaz took full ownership of Solstra. In December 2010, he sold the properties in Lyngby, Aarhus and Odense to ATP and PensionDanmark for an estimated price of DKK 1.5 billion, keeping only the flagship building at Kongens Nytorv. In September 2020, financially troubled Debenhams put its seven store Danish chain, Magasin du Nord, up for sale. In May 2021 the company was acquired by Peek & Cloppenburg KG, Düsseldorf.

== Department stores ==
=== Other branches ===
Magasin du Nord has three more stores in the Copenhagen area, located in the Field's shopping centre in Ørestad and in the suburbs of Lyngby and Rødovre. The chain further comprises branches in the cities of Odense, Aarhus and Aalborg.

== Museum ==
On 2 February 2013, an exhibition about Magasin du Nord's history opened at the Kongens Nytorv store. It illustrates more than 150 years of retail history in Denmark. It is run by the Magasin du Nord Foundation.

== Magasin du Nord Fashion Prize ==
The Magasin du Nord Fashion Prize is awarded annually to a Danish fashion brand or designer. With a grand prize of DKK 300.000, Magasin du Nord Fashion Prize is Denmark’s largest design award.
