= Jean Touitou =

Tunisian-French businessman

Jean Touitou (born December 10, 1951 in Tunis, Tunisia) is a Tunisian-French creative director and founder of A.P.C.

== Early life and career ==
Touitou was born on December 10, 1951, in Tunis, to a Tunisian Jewish family. He was then "a revolutionary militant for a few years". His family was in the leather business. He arrived in Paris from Tunisia with his family in 1960 at age 9. He studied at École alsacienne, then earned a degree in history and geography from the Sorbonne, and travelled a year in South America and the United States after his studies.

== Career ==
=== Early beginnings ===
Upon his return in Paris in 1977, Touitou worked for the designer Takada Kenzo. After a few years working as a warehouseman and an accountant, he started working at Agnès b. in 1985, he associated with Irié, a Japanese designer working in Paris.

=== A.P.C., 1987–present ===
In 1987, Jean Touitou launched A.P.C. (Atelier de Production et de Création) with the menswear collection HIVER 87. The following year, the collection became unisex. In 1989, the labels referring to the seasons were replaced with A.P.C. labels, confirming the creation of the brand located in the 6th arrondissement of Paris.

The first pieces of the A.P.C. collections were inspired by work or military clothes, the preeminence of classic and unmixed fabrics (Shetland wool for instance), as well as voluntarily traditional cuts. The collection would later include the raw Japanese denim. In thirty years of existence, A.P.C. remained independent and developed internationally, with more than 70 points of sale over the globe and 350 employees.

Touitou works alongside his wife, Judith Touitou, artistic director of A.P.C. They met at A.P.C., where Judith started working in 1996, after studying business and then politics at Sciences Po in Paris, to help Jean run the company.

Touitou and fellow designer Vanessa Seward are partners in Vanessa Seward, which launched in 2015. In 2016, he started a collaboration with the American clothing company Outdoor Voices to create sportswear apparel.

== Awards and honors ==
- 1992 : Winner of the ANDAM award

== Controversy ==
In 2015, during the fall menswear presentation, Touitou repeatedly used the "n-word" to present the collection named Last Niggas in Paris (a mix of Jay-Z and Kanye West's Niggas in Paris and the film Last Tango in Paris), a collaboration with Timberland. A few days later, Timberland cut its ties with Touitou, calling his collection "in complete contrast with our values". Touitou immediately apologized for his offensive speech.

== Philanthropy ==
Touitou opened a private kindergarten, Ateliers de la Petite Enfance (A.P.E.), in 2008.

== Personal life ==
Touitou has three children.

Since 2003, Touitou has lived in an apartment in the 6th arrondissement of Paris. Since 2018, he has also been maintaining a holiday compound on Pantelleria.
