= Anne Sofie Madsen =

Danish fashion designer (born 1979)

Anne Sofie Madsen is a Danish fashion designer who grew up on the island of Funen and graduated from the Royal Danish Academy of Fine Arts, School of Design, also known as the Danish Design School, in 2009. She established her own fashion label in 2011 and presented her first collection at London Fashion Week the following year.

== Early life and education ==
She showed an early interest in fashion after seeing a collection designed by Jean Paul Gaultier in one of her mother's magazines. In 2002, she went on to study at the Royal Danish Academy of Fine Arts, where she decided to specialize in fashion.

In 2006, Madsen received practical training in Paris where she deepened her understanding of materials while at Peclers, a trend-setting agency. Still in Paris, she then interned with John Galliano who was then Dior's head designer. She returned to Denmark to study at the Royal Danish Academy of Fine Arts School of Design, graduating with a master's degree in 2009. After graduation, she set about establishing her own business, opening her practice in 2010.

== Fashion career ==
A review of Copenhagen Fashion Week 2014 in The Guardian wrote that: "Anne Sofie Madsen's cyberpunk girls helped define the fashion event." In 2017, The Guardian wrote that inspiration could be found in the "models at Anne Sofie Madsen who layered several blankets into a dress". She showed a spring 2017 collection in Tokyo and a 2018 ready to wear collection in Paris in autumn 2017.

Madsen has described a variety of sources of inspiration for her designs, such as mythology and museums, the Miracle Strip Amusement Park in Miami, Florida, with its "vision of abandoned thrills and discarded pleasures", Jesper Just's art film, Sirens of Chrome (2010), and "contrasts and borders between the primitive and civilized, the exotic and classic, the barbaric and elegant, the futuristic and historical". She combines soft, smooth and tough, hard materials in her designs, and often uses digital prints of her own illustrations for the garments.

By 2014, the Danish Design Museum had selected some of her creations for their permanent collection.

In 2021 she collaborated with crochet artist Lulu Kaalund to produce a limited edition of eleven handmade designs, using materials including leather, suede, cotton and wool.

== Awards ==
In October 2013, Madsen won the Dansk Design Talent award which was presented by then-Crown Princess Mary for the five fashion designs she had created for the Danish singer Oh Land. In 2015, she won the DHL Exported award for the collections she was to show in Tokyo.
