= Babeth Djian =

Elisabeth Djian
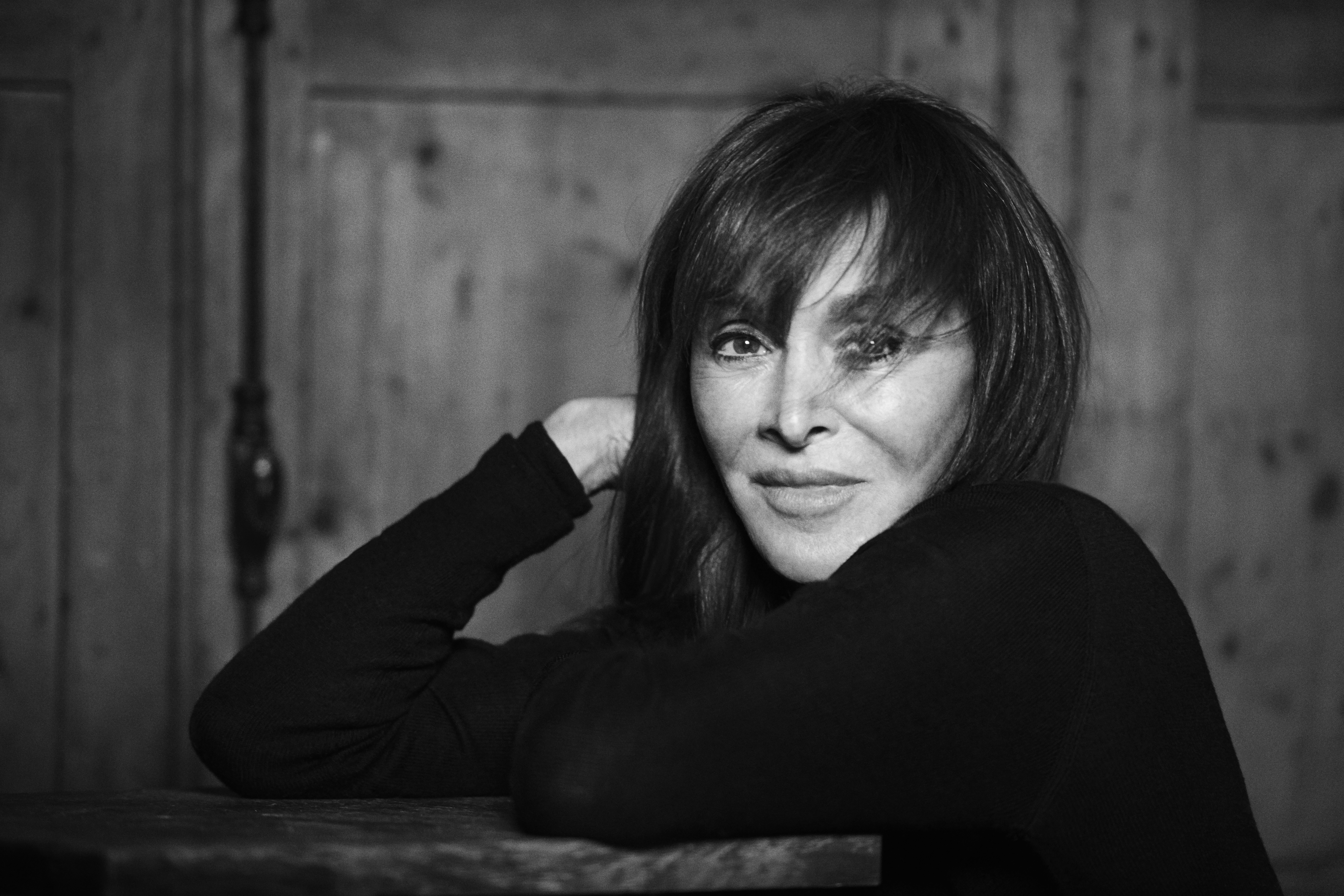
- Babeth Djian, Paris, 2018 © Peter Lindbergh (Courtesy Peter Lindbergh Foundation, Paris).
- Born: Casablanca,Morocco
- Occupation: Publishing Director
- Awards: Ordre national du Mérite

Elisabeth Djian is the founder and editorial director of Numéro, a media outlet specializing in fashion, art and culture, and honorary president of the AEM association for the children of Rwanda.

== Biography ==
=== Early years ===
Djian grew up in Morocco. She is the daughter of a lawyer. When she was ten years old she moved to Paris. She went to law school to please her father, but found she didn't enjoy it. When she was 24, she enrolled at the Studio Berçot fashion school.

=== Early career ===
In the 1980s, Djian took her first professional steps in the editorial staff of Elle magazine, before participating in the launch of Jill magazine, between 1983 and 1985. In the 1990s, she collaborated with Vogue Paris and Vogue Italy magazines and with photographers such as Peter Lindbergh.

=== Magazine issue ===
In 1998, Djian founded Numéro magazine and launched the first issue in March 1999 with Kate Moss on the cover, photographed by Mert Alas and Marcus Piggott. She launched the bi-annual magazine Numéro Homme in 2001 and the bi-annual contemporary creation media Numéro art in 2017.

=== Editions ===
Babeth Djian is the author of several fashion works including the book Babeth published in 2008 and Numéro Couture which retraces 15 years of collaboration with Karl Lagerfeld, published in 2015 by Steidl.

== Other commitments ==
Since 2006, Babeth Djian has been honorary president of the AEM association "a future for the children of the world" and organizes every year a charity evening bringing together fashion and luxury brands to support projects for children in Rwanda.

== Awards ==
Babeth Djian was named Knight of the National Order of Merit in 2021. The decoration was presented to her by Jean-Paul Gaultier during the AEM evening in 2022.
