= Marie Seznec Martinez =

French sylist and fashion model (1958–2015)

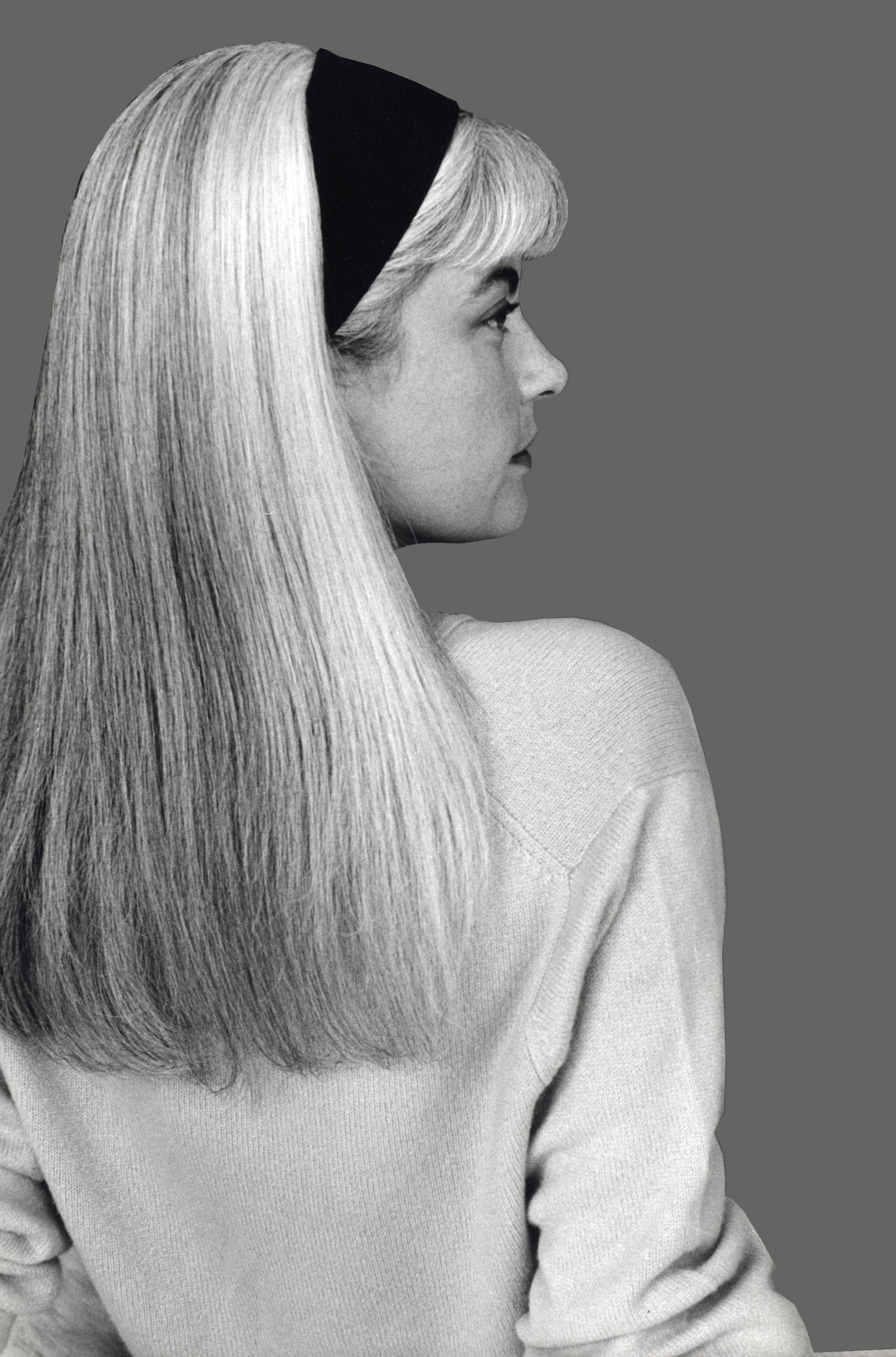
- Born: 12 April 1958; Quimper, Brittany, France
- Died: 12 November 2015 (aged 57); Monaco
- Occupations: Stylist, former fashion model
- Years active: 1982–2009

Marie Seznec Martinez (12 April 1958 – 12 November 2015) was a French stylist, former fashion model and ambassador for Christian Lacroix.

== Biography ==
Marie Seznec grew up in Quimper, in southern Brittany, France. Her parents owned a clothing store.

She moved to Paris at age eighteen, where she studied at Studio Berçot fashion school and worked for different designers (mesh collections, accessories, belts, bags). In 1982, she worked as a stylist and model on occasion, when she was noticed by the Marilyn Agency in a publication in the magazine Elle.

Martinez began a modeling career "for fun," according to her. She then modeled for Jean Paul Gaultier, Issey Miyake, Cacharel, Kenzo, Yohji Yamamoto, Adeline André, and Hermès. Her white hair is widely involved in her success as a model.

At Hermès, she met Christian Lacroix who hired her immediately as a model. In 1987, she became the face of Christian Lacroix. Lacroix said he loves "her sweet side" and that she "acts like a child of the eighteenth century." She signed a contract with Lacroix.

She met Hubert Boukobza, then boss of Bains, with whom she spent three years. On 15 June 1990, she met Jacques Martinez, painter and sculptor. This was a lightning romance with a proposal on the following Friday, and they married soon after in Tourrettes-sur-Loup.

Two years later, Christian Lacroix offered to move her to the high fashion branch. She met some success, hailed among others in the pink pages of Figaro or Madame Figaro, until the closure of high fashion department beginning in December 2009. She then launched her own brand.

Martinez died of cancer 12 November 2015, in Monaco.
