= Sophie Theallet =

French fashion designer (born 1964)

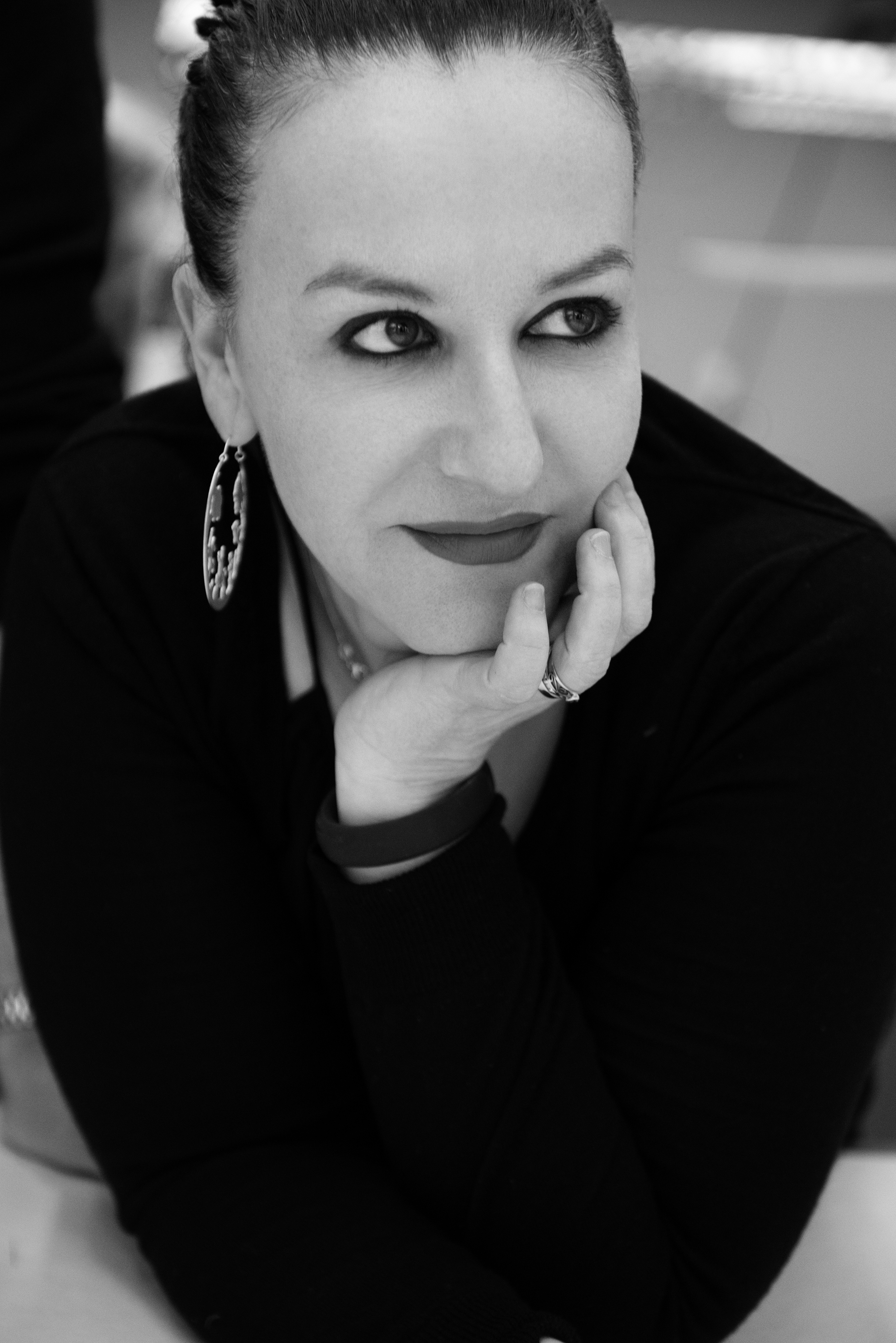
- Born: France
- Education: Le Studio Bercot
- Labels: Sophie Theallet, Room 502
- Awards: National Young Designer Award CFDA/Vogue Fashion Fund Award Woolmark Prize

Sophie Theallet (born 1964 in Bagnères-de-Bigorre, France) is a French fashion designer whose clients include First Lady Michelle Obama, Jennifer Lopez, Jessica Alba, Oprah Winfrey, and Gabrielle Union.

== Career ==
At 18, Sophie Theallet moved to Paris to attend the fashion design school, Studio Berçot. She graduated early after winning France's "National Young Design Award" and was hired by Jean-Paul Gaultier.

Theallet then joined Azzedine Alaïa for a decade before moving to New York City. She now lives in Montreal.

After moving to New York City, Theallet continued to work with Alaïa on a part-time basis, while also freelancing for other fashion labels.

In 2007, she launched her own label, Sophie Theallet. In 2009, she won the CFDA/Vogue Fashion Fund Award. In 2012, she won the US Woolmark Prize. In 2015, Theallet was a Couture Consultant to Director Jocelyn Moorhouse for the movie The Dressmaker starring Kate Winslet

Theallet is an advocate for inclusion, representation, and diversity in her fashion campaigns and runway shows. In 2014, she partnered with retailer Lane Bryant to bring luxury design to the plus-size market. She is a trailblazer for opening the road for representation of plus-size models on the runway and in high-end fashion.

Vogue writes about her fashion shows regularly. For example, the spring 2014 show, which by standing convention was held in fall 2013, generated comments from the reviewer that her work "established a tone of ripe sexuality".

In November 2016, Theallet wrote an open letter explaining that she would not be dressing future First Lady Melania Trump due to what she described as "racist and xenophobic" rhetoric emerging from the tone of Donald Trump's campaign efforts for the US presidency. She was followed shortly by designers Tom Ford and Marc Jacobs. A few days later, Tommy Hilfiger responded to Theallet's statement by saying Melania "is a very beautiful woman" and that he felt "any designer should be proud to dress her".

In 2018, she and her family relocated to Montreal where she founded her new label, Room 502, a limited-edition line that is entirely self-funded and sold only through their website.
