= Magasin du Nord Fashion Prize =

- Awarded for: fashion
- Sponsored by: Magasin
- Location: Denmark
- Country: Denmark
- Presented by: Magasin Foundation
- Reward: DKK 500,000
- First award: 2013; 13 years ago
- Final award: 2018; 8 years ago

Highlights
- Most awards: Anne Sofie Madsen

Television/radio coverage
- Network: Fashion Week TV
- Produced by: Magasin Foundation

The Magasin du Nord Fashion Prize is awarded annually by the Magasin Foundation to an up and coming Danish fashion designer or brand. The winner receives DKK 300,000 and a fashion show during Copenhagen Fashion Week in February the following year.

== History ==
The fashion award was first presented under the name Dansk Design Talent (Danish Design Talent) by the Magasin Foundation in 2013. The award was from 2015 rebranded in a partnership with the fashion magazine Dansk under the name Dansk Design Talent - Magasin Prisen. It changed its name to the Magasin du Nord Fashion Prize in 2017.

== Selection process ==
The nominees are selected by a panel of Danish design business and branding specialists. The final winner is selected by an international jury based on criteria such as design, brand value and business plan.

== Laureates and nominees ==
Year	Laureate	Nominees	Ref
2013	Anne Sofie Madsen	Asger Juel Larsen, Nikoline Liv Andersen, Astrid Andersen	
2014	Mark Kenly Domino Tan	Freya Dalsjø, Kjetil Aas, Trine Lindegaard	
2015	Tonsure	Tatiana Andersen Camre, Nicholas Nybro, Maikel Tawadros	
2016	Cecilie Bahnsen	Ellen Pedersen, Muf10, Saks Potts	
2017	Lærke Andersen	Clouds, Randy Collection, All At Sea	
2018	Emilie Helmstedt	Blanche; Christine Hyun Mi Nielsen	
2021	A. Roege Hove	(di)vision, Berner Kühl, Louise Lyngh Bjerregaard	
