= Battle of Zhangjiawan =

Part of the Second Opium War (1860)

- Part of the Second Opium War
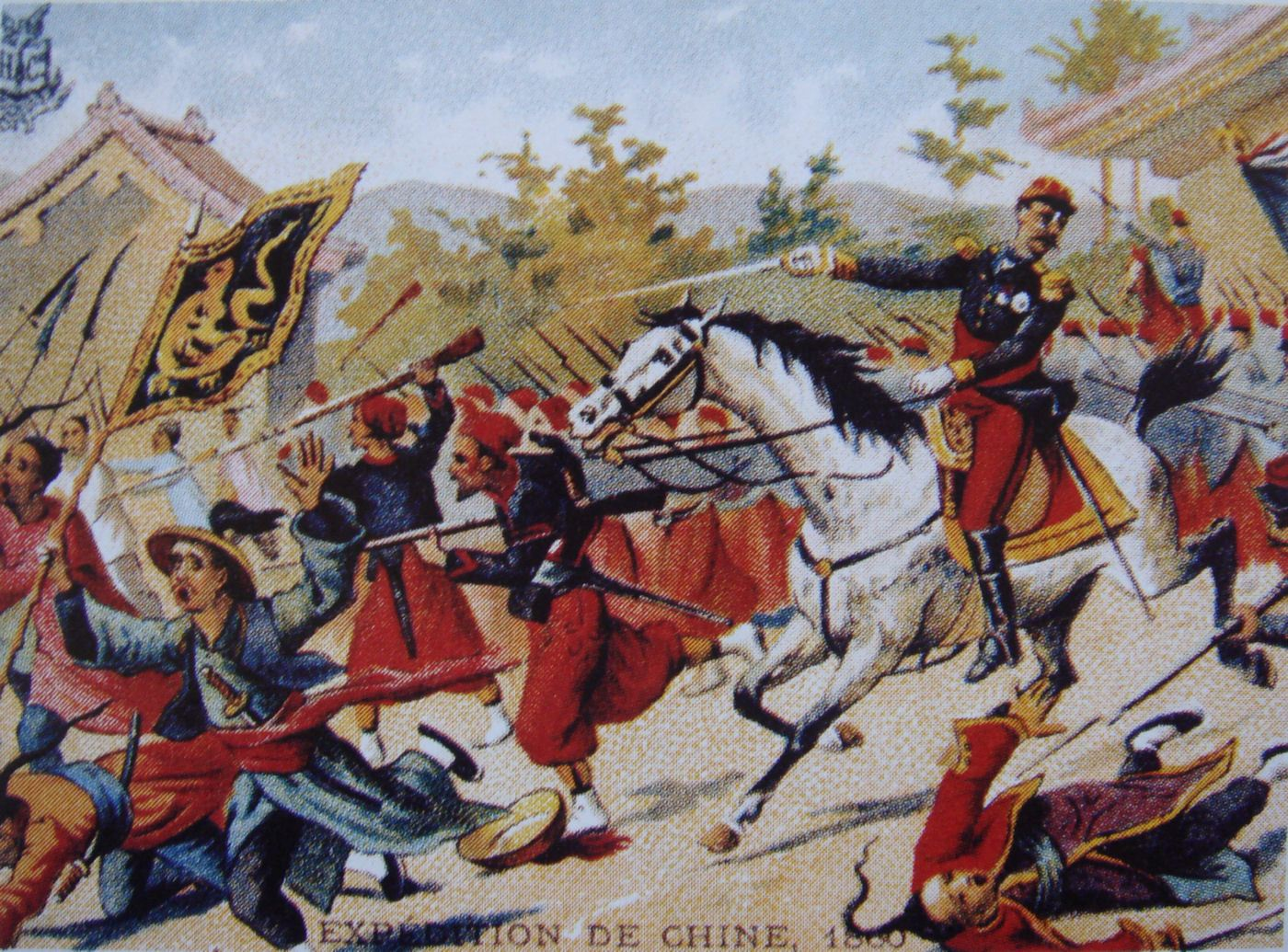
- Cousin-Montauban leading French forces
| Date | 18 September 1860 |
| Location | Zhangjiawan, near Tongzhou, China |
| Result | Franco-British victory |

Belligerents
| France; United Kingdom | Qing China |

Commanders and leaders
| (France) Charles Guillaume Cousin-Montauban (United Kingdom of Great Britain and Ireland) James Hope Grant | Sengge Rinchen |

Strength
| 4,000 | 2,000–3,000 |

Casualties and losses
| French: 2 killed 14 wounded British: 1 killed 19 wounded | Heavy; 80 guns captured |

Battle of Zhangjiawan (Chinese: 張家灣戰役) or Battle of Chang-kia-wan was fought by British and French forces against China at the town of Zhangjiawan (to the east of Tongzhou) during the Second Opium War on the morning of 18 September 1860.

== Battle ==
The combined Anglo-French force which had recently occupied Tianjin engaged a Chinese army at Zhangjiawan. British cavalry won a battle against Mongolian cavalry, French infantry crushed the defence of Chinese troops, and British-French artillery inflicting massive losses on the Chinese Qing army.

== Aftermath ==
Since infantry was the worst part of the Qing army, the Qing commander-in-chief Sengge Rinchen decided to use his cavalry against the Anglo-French forces. The Battle of Palikao took place three days later.
