= Konstantin Kakanias =

Greek artist

Konstantin Kakanias (born September 18, 1961 in Athens) is a contemporary Greek painter and multimedia artist. He currently lives and works in Los Angeles and Greece. Throughout his career Kakanias has created drawings, paintings, sculptures, performances, ceramics and books.

Kakanias' work does not belong to any single style. He is known to explore a range of themes in his work from the light and comic to the dark and psychological

== Career ==
Kakanias moved to Paris in 1979. He attended the Studio Berçot where he studied Fashion and Art (1981-1984). He was also taught by the Italian artist and stage designer Lila de Nobili. Kakanias started his career at 22, working as an illustrator for newspapers and magazines such as French Vogue and Vogue Italia. He created textile designs for Yves Saint Laurent and Christian Lacroix.

1984, Kakanias moved to Luxor, Egypt to study Ancient Egyptian art and remained there for a year. His art has been influenced by this experience. "Echoes of pharaohs and hieroglyphs reverberate in many of Kakanias' drawings today."

=== Athens, Greece ===
He has been working with Rebecca Camhi gallery for more than 30 years and has been extensively showing his work. Notable solo exhibitions of him at Rebecca Camhi Gallery are: 1998, "Yes, Yes, Yes," (exhibition and performance), Rebecca Camhi Gallery, October 22 - December 12 2009, "Daniel," Rebecca Camhi Gallery, October 12 - November 28 2012, Tependris Rising, Rebecca Camhi Gallery, October 24- December 22.

=== New York ===
In 1988, Kakanias moved back to New York City where he collaborated with Tiffany and Barneys New York. His drawings were published by The New York Times and Vanity Fair. In 1991 he dedicated himself completely to making art. In 1995 he had a breakthrough exhibition "No More Stains" at the Postmasters Gallery in New York with sculptures and a performance.

In 1996 Kakanias introduced his fictional heroine Mrs.Tependris for an illustrated New York Times Magazine article. Mrs. Tependris, Kakanias' "alter-ego," is a caricature of an art collector and a high society doyenne who Kakanias uses as "a metaphor for the state of contemporary art and its superficial reception by the public". Mrs. Tependris has become a cult figure in the art community. In 1997 he created his first book Freedom or Death based on the adventures of Mrs. Tependris.

=== Los Angeles ===
Kakanias moved to Los Angeles in 1997. For several years he continued working on the adventures of Mrs. Tependris and in 2002 published Mrs. Tependris: the Contemporary Years. In 2004 Kakanias was commissioned by the Greek Ministry of Culture to create a book for the 2004 Summer Olympics in Athens.

Kakanias has exhibited around the world in museums and galleries, notably "Time Goes By So Slowly" at the Goulandris Museum of Cycladic Art in 2006 and "A Tribute to Antonis Benakis" at the Benaki Museum in 2004-5. In Rebecca Camhi gallery in Athens, Greece "Yes, Yes, Yes," (exhibition and performance). In 2008 he collaborated with Diane von Fürstenberg to create the comic book Be The Wonder Woman You Can Be. (DC Comics 2008). He has done numerous private commissions. In 2004 Kakanias frescoed a church in Spain for Carolina Herrera Jr.

== Publications ==
- Freedom or Death. Jane Stubbs. 1997.
- Mrs. Tependris: the Contemporary Years. Rizzoli International. 2002.
- Mrs. Tependris…just before the Olympic games in Athens 2004. Published by the Greek Ministry of Culture. 2004.
- Untitled III (Parade) limited edition. Kalfayan galleries. 2008.

== Exhibitions ==
- Thirty Nine (Anna Wintour Glasses), Rebecca Camhi Gallery, 2012
