= Peclers =

French trend consulting agency

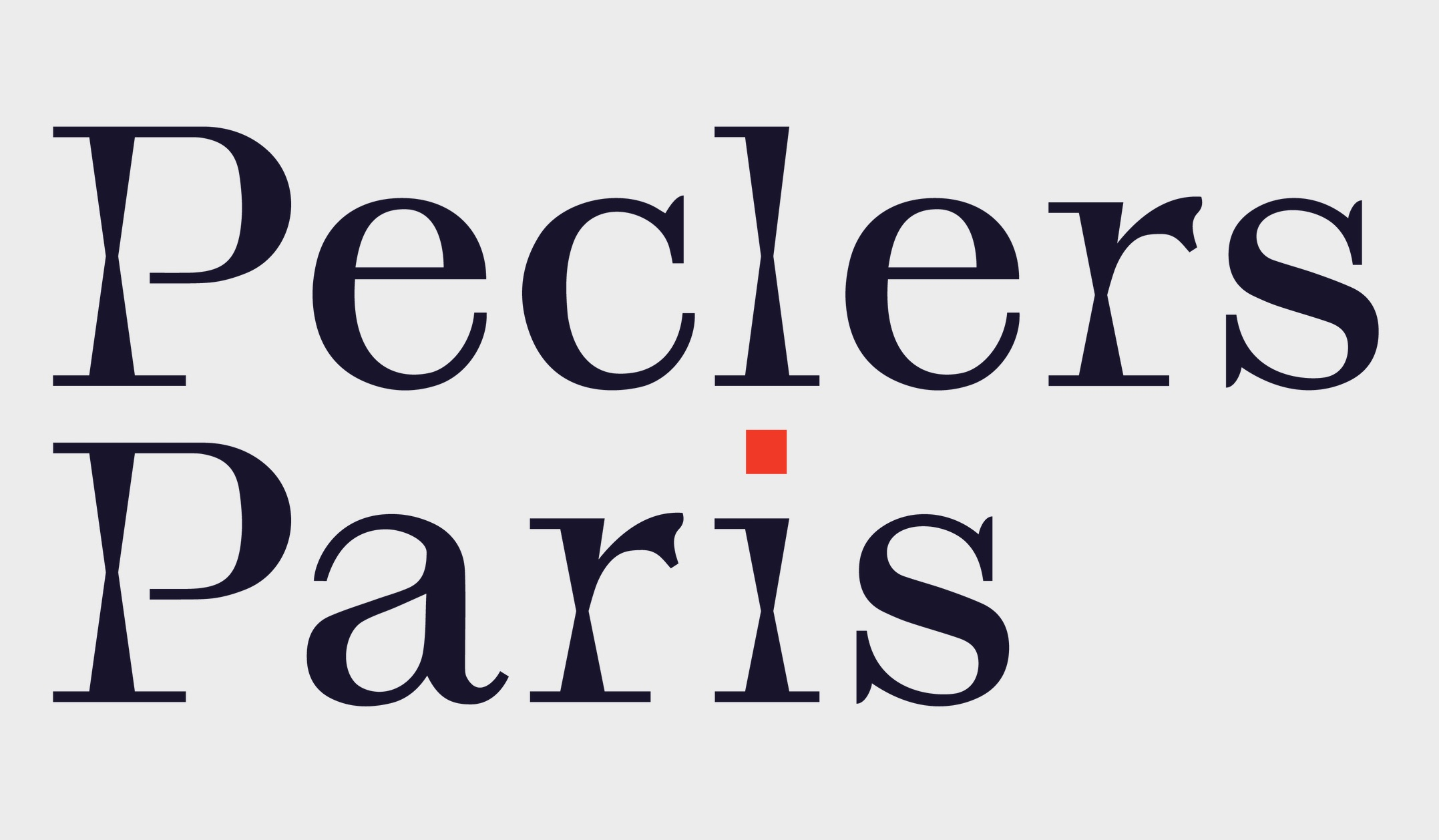
- Type: Private
- Industry: Trend analysis
- Founded: 1970; 56 years ago in Paris
- Headquarters: Paris, France
- Number of locations: Paris, New York City, Shanghai
- Area served: Worldwide
- Key people: Dominique Peclers
- Products: Trend books, fashion Trends, brand Strategy
- Website: www.peclersparis.com

Peclers is French fashion trend consulting agency founded in Paris in 1970 by Dominique Peclers. The company provides trend analysis, consumer reports, and brand strategies for multiple brands and creative individuals. Peclers' creative team develops seasonal trend books that serve as a foundation for businesses in the fashion and home industries.

The agency offers trend forecasts and styling intelligence, catering to various sectors such as retail, beauty, wellness and cosmetics, electronics, and consumer goods.

== History ==
The company was founded by Dominique Peclers in Paris, France min 1970.

In 2001, it opened its first office in New York In 2003, the company joined WPP plc, a multinational advertising and public relations company in London, England

In 2007, Eric Duchamp joins as president of Peclers Paris. In 2010, the company opened its second office in Shanghai.
