= A.P.C. =

Clothing company

A.P.C. Clothing
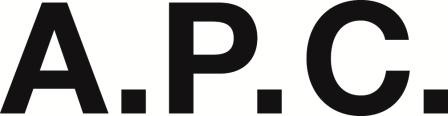
- Type: Private
- Industry: Fashion
- Founded: 1987
- Founder: Jean Touitou
- Headquarters: Paris, France
- Products: Clothing, Fashion accessories, Footwear, Jewellery
- Website: www.apc.fr

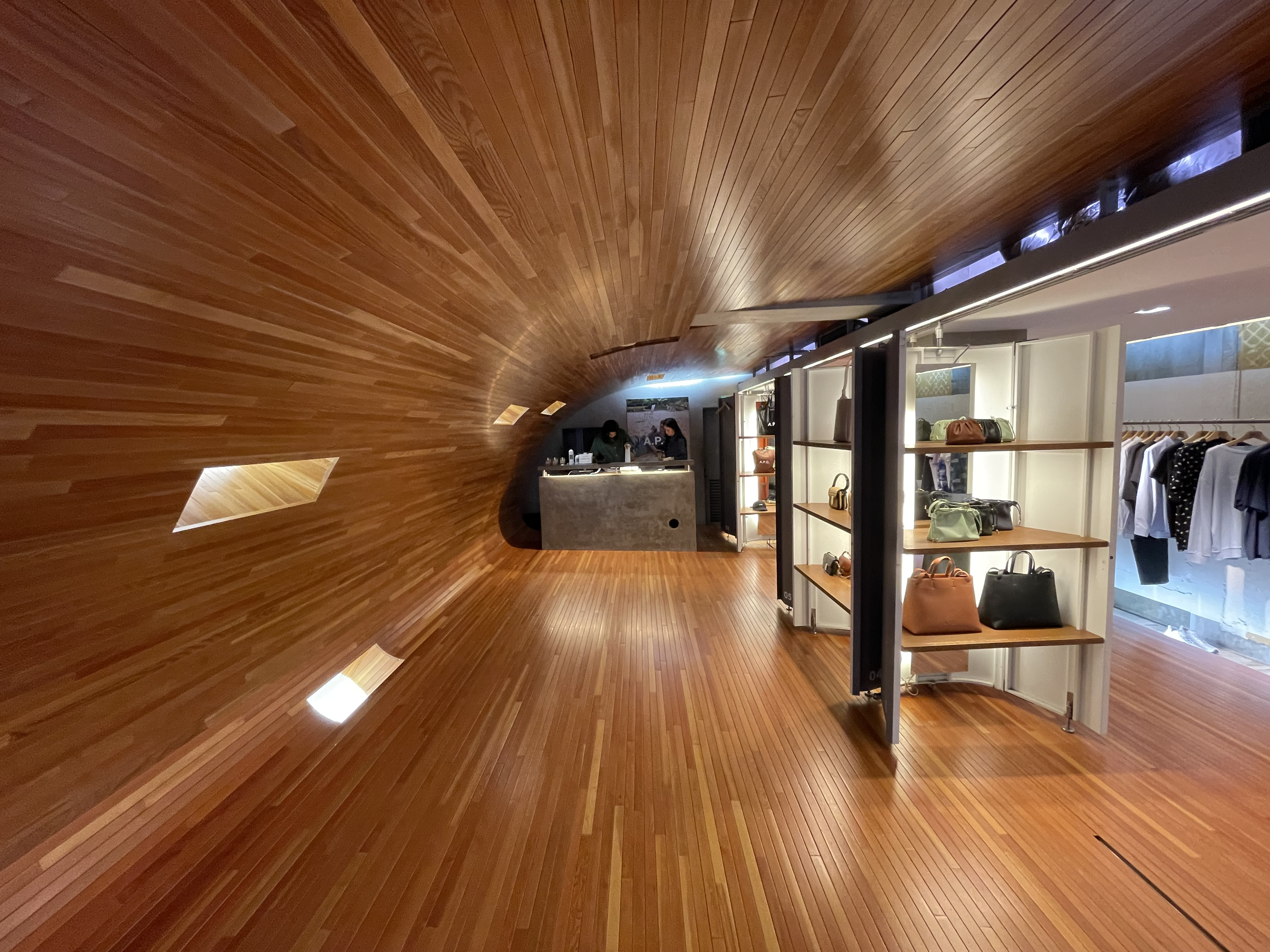
Interior of the A.P.C. Harajuku Underground store in Ura-Harajuku, Tokyo

Atelier de Production et de Création, or A.P.C., is a French ready-to-wear luxury brand founded in 1987 by Jean Touitou in Paris.

== History ==
In 1987, Jean Touitou created a clothing line which would later become the A.P.C. brand. The clothes from this first menswear collection wear labels that only mention "HIVER 1987". It was only in 1989 that the labels referring to the seasons are replaced with A.P.C. labels, confirming the creation of the brand.

The brand opened several international stores including Tokyo Daikanyama in 1991 and New York Mercer Street in 1993.

The first pieces of the A.P.C. collections were characterized by minimalist designs, clean lines, and simple patterns. The collection would later include raw Japanese denim. Touitou's co-designer, Louis Wong, has a small line of high-end jackets, Louis W., under the A.P.C. umbrella.

In 2011, designer Jessica Ogden launched the first collection of A.P.C. quilts, elaborated with fabric remnants as well. When Vanessa Seward joined A.P.C. in 2012, she was first given a capsule collection, and then eventually her own women's wear line. In 2018, the brand's first sneaker line was launched.

A.P.C. is also starting to organize parades and since 2018 they have been included in the official calendar of the Fédération française de la couture.

In 2023, A.P.C. agreed to sell a majority stake for an undisclosed sum to investment firm L Catterton, forming a strategic partnership to grow the brand internationally.

In May 2024, A.P.C. expanded its range with its first unisex sunglasses collection, a tribute to New York rock band The Velvet Underground.

== Collaborations ==
A.P.C. has done collaborations with brands and creatives including Kanye West (2013), Outdoor Voices (2016), Kid Cudi (2019), Suzanne Koller (2019), Brain Dead (2019), Carhartt WIP, RTH, Catherine Deneuve, Charlotte Chesnais, Goop (2020), Lacoste (2023), and Asics Tennis (2024).

== Campaigns ==
Past A.P.C. campaigns have been styled and photographed by Carine Roitfeld (1995), Bruce Weber (2008), Stella Tennant and Collier Schorr (2016).
