= Guillermo Vargas =

Costa Rican artist

Guillermo Vargas Jiménez
- Born: September 18, 1975 (age 50); San José, Costa Rica

Guillermo Vargas Jiménez, (Note: In this name that follows Hispanic American naming customs, the first or paternal surname is Vargas and the second or maternal family name is Jiménez.) also known as Habacuc, (born September 18, 1975) is an artist best known for the controversy caused when he exhibited an emaciated dog in a gallery in Nicaragua in 2007.

== Life and work ==
Born in San José, Costa Rica, Guillermo Vargas studied to be a special education teacher at the Universidad Interamericana de Costa Rica, but he did not graduate. Vargas describes himself as a self-taught artist. Vargas's media include photography, paintings, performance art, installation art, theatrical dance, and video. He has exhibited In Mexico, Nicaragua and Costa Rica, as well as at the Inter-American Development Bank in the United States. Vargas was chosen as one of six representatives from Costa Rica to present at the Bienal Centroamericana Honduras in 2008 and again for the Bienal del Istmo 2010. In June, 2010, two of Vargas's videos were to be presented at the Bienal de Pontevedra in Spain; however, after Vargas showed up wearing a T-shirt that read "camisETA," his videos were removed from the program.

== Exposición N° 1 ==
One of the images that spread via the Internet along with allegations that the dog was starved to death

In August, 2007, Vargas displayed his "Exposición N° 1" in the Códice Gallery in Managua, Nicaragua. The exposition included the burning of 175 pieces of crack cocaine and an ounce of marijuana while the Sandinista anthem played backwards. The work also included an emaciated dog tied to a wall by a length of rope with "Eres Lo Que Lees" ("You Are What You Read") written on the wall in dog food. According to Vargas, the work included a fifth element: the media.

The work attracted controversy when it was reported that the dog had starved to death as part of Vargas's work. Photographs of the exhibit appeared on the Internet, showing the dog tied to the wall in a room full of standing people. There are no indications in the photos of where or when they were taken, nor of who took them. The outrage triggered by the photos and the allegations that the dog had been left to starve to death quickly spread internationally via blogs, e-mails, and other unconfirmed sources, including internet petitions to prevent Vargas from participating in the 2008 Bienal Centroamericana in Honduras that received over four million signatures. Vargas endorsed the petition, saying that he, too, had signed it.

Juanita Bermúdez, the director of the Códice Gallery, stated that the animal was fed regularly and was only tied up for three hours on one day before it escaped. Vargas himself refused to comment on the fate of the dog, but noted that no one tried to free the dog, give it food, call the police, or do anything for it. Vargas stated that the exhibit and the surrounding controversy highlight people's hypocrisy because no one cares about a dog that starves to death in the street. In an interview with El Tiempo, Vargas explained that he was inspired by the death of Natividad Canda, an indigent Nicaraguan addict who was killed by two Rottweilers in Cartago Province, Costa Rica, while being filmed by the news media in the presence of police, firefighters, and security guards.

Upon conducting a probe, the Humane Society of the United States was informed that the dog was in a state of starvation when it was captured and escaped after one day of captivity; however, the organization also categorically condemned "the use of live animals in exhibits such as this". The World Society for the Protection of Animals (WSPA) also investigated the exhibit. WSPA found the information regarding the issue to be "inconsistent" and met with sponsors of the Honduras Bienal to ensure that no animals would be abused at the 2008 exhibition in that country.

== Axioma ==
In December 2013, Vargas presented his work Axioma in a gallery in Heredia, Costa Rica. Habacuc presented a healthy dog (named Axioma) and promised to begin a blog, publishing one photo per day of the dog until the Costa Rican elections in February 2014. The photos were said to show the effects of the passing of time on the dog and were to paired with images of the "myths" reported in the official report on the state of the nation. Vargas was accused of planning to document the starvation of the dog. The animal welfare organization Asesoría Legal Animal published one of the photos on Facebook, asking for help in stopping Vargas. In the ensuing controversy, the blog was taken down, and the Costa Rican National Animal Health Service investigated the case, finding the dog in good health. Vargas explained that he had found the dog on the street in 2010 and had documented its recuperation over time. The idea had been to upload the photos of the dog's recuperation in reverse order. Vargas described the reaction to his work as typical of a world in which people form opinions without being informed.

== Awards ==
- First place Bienarte 2005, San José, Costa Rica.
- First place Bienarte 2007, San José, Costa Rica.
- First place Bienarte 2009, San José, Costa Rica.
