= Bedre Byggeskik =

Architectural style in Denmark

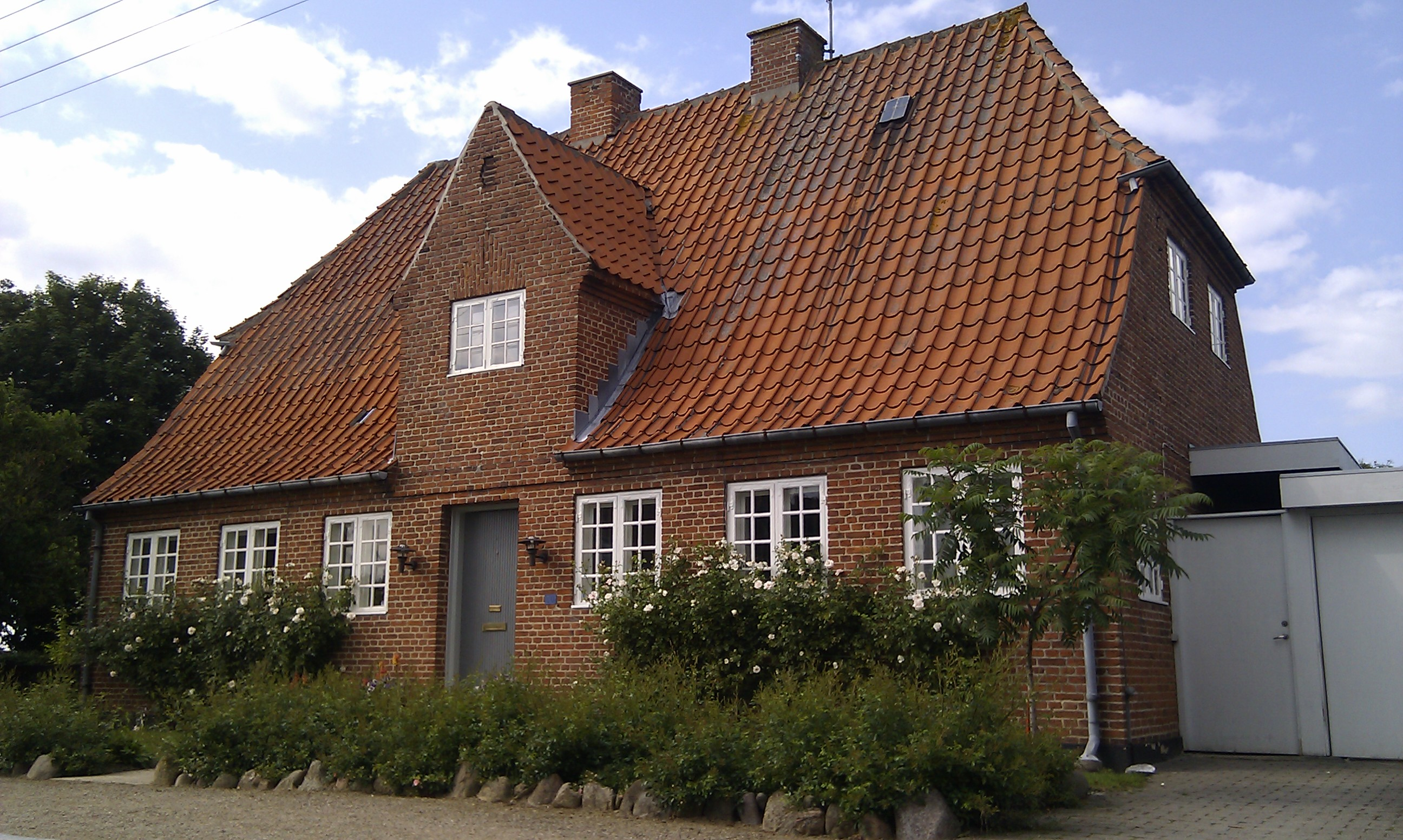
Typical Bedre Byggeskik house with a wall dormer

Bedre Byggeskik (UK: /bɛðrʔʌbʔjɡəskʔik/ Danish: Landsforeningen Bedre Byggeskik, lit. 'National Association of Better Building Practice') is a former association of Danish architects, and an architectural style of interwar period, that combined traditional Danish architecture with simple materials and high level of quality. It is one of the most common house styles in Denmark (with the exception of Greenland).

== History ==
"The National Association for Better Building Practice" (Landsforeningen Bedre Byggeskik) was initiated in late 1900's by various members of Danish upper class, as a reaction to the deterioration of housing quality in the countryside, caused by industrialization that brought new cheap materials to the market, such as cast iron, roofing felt, slate and cement. Its intention was to preserve the local tradition and building techniques, saving the landscape from what writer Emma Gad described as the "Immeasurable decline of taste".

One of the earliest examples of the style (Bakkekammen 40, Holbæk), built in 1917 and listed as National heritage site

The initiators of the association consisted of architects, builders, craftsmen, historians and ordinary householders with different cultural personalities. The Danish Association of Architects along with Danish National Exhibition of 1909 also considerably contributed to the formation of the movement. In a search for simple and authentic buildings, members studied the older domestic architecture built by local craftsmen. Some architects had worked free of charge so that builders could get help in preparing project drawings. These projects were later distributed for little or no money to anyone in need. Customers could order blueprints and have local masters handle the construction, which is why these homes are often referred to as "master builder villas" (Murermestervilla).

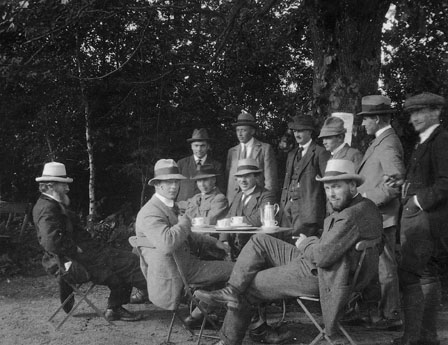
Founding meeting in 1915

By 1911, Ivar Bentsen founded the "master builder school" (Bygmesterskole) in the town of Holbæk. On 27 June 1915, the association was formalized on the meeting in Odense. In 1916, the drawing office "Tegnehjælpen", that provided affordable building assessment was opened and led by Harald Nielsen. Holbæk, and specifically the Bakkekammen street, became the earliest hub for a large scale experiment of the practice, driven by architects Ivar Bentsen and his apprentice Marius Pedersen, who built 25 houses in the area from 1917, while Peder Vilhelm Jensen-Klint and others gave architectural lectures at town's building school and across the country, along with exhibitions and courses. Newspaper articles and standalone publications made by members, like the "Housing Book" (1926) and the "Bygmesterbog" (1932 and 1941) helped to spread the knowledge and awareness further among the public. The association was also responsible for the construction of parsonages, retirement homes and schools across rural areas.

Following the financial crisis, organization's activities shrank, as many of its functions were integrated into the public bodies, such as Ministry of Housing, at the same time as state subsidies have decreased. At the time, enterprise wasn't profitable and was funded largely by its members. The association began to loose influence, implementing limited amounts of new materials and leaning towards Functionalism in urban areas. During the war, civic construction was severely limited, and after it ended, the ideas of conservatism and patriotism, that were the core values behind Bedre Byggeskik's philosophy have fallen out of fashion in society. The association officially ceased to exist in 1965.

== Design ==
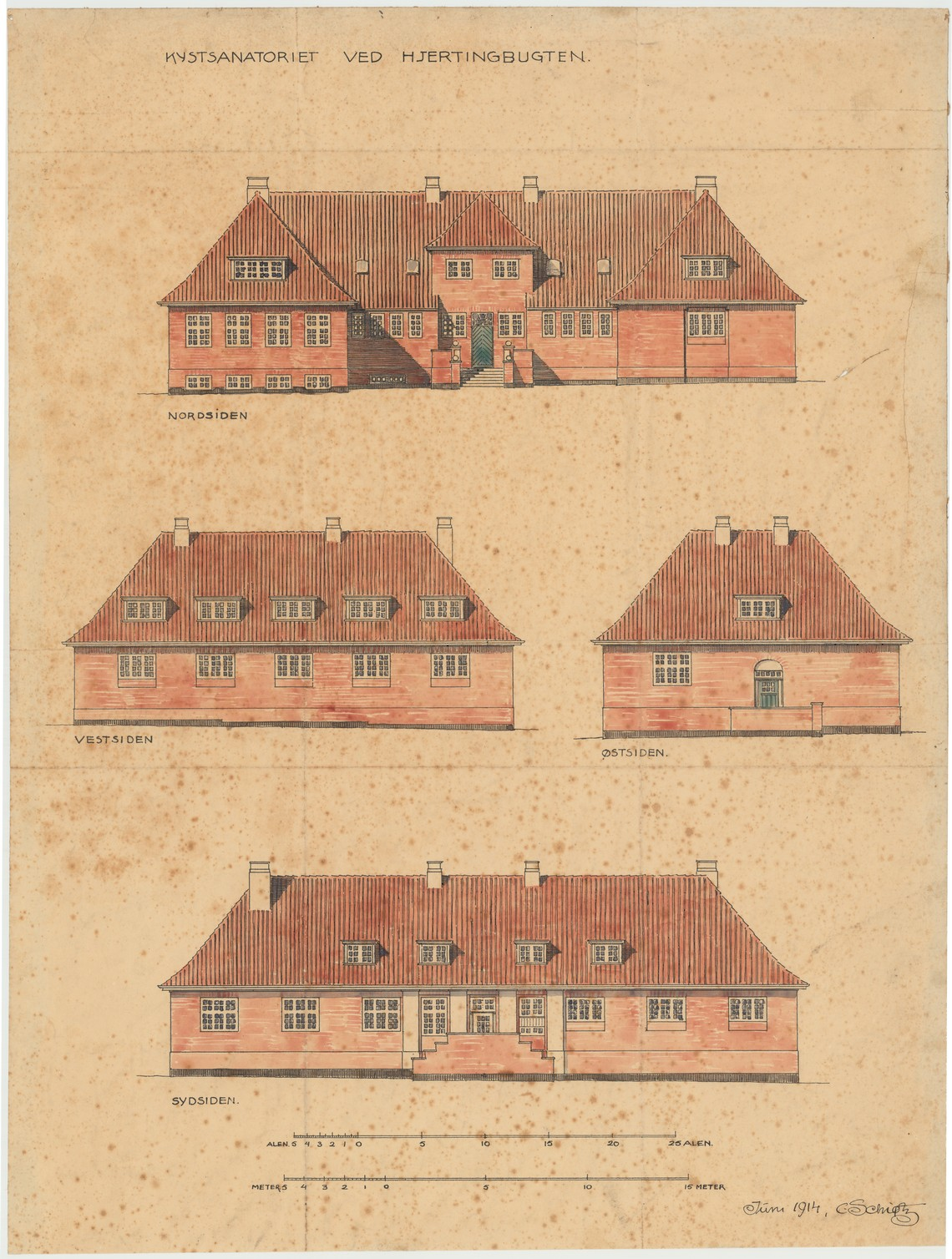
Some of the sketches of Bedre Byggeskik project

Byggeskik was the word for existing way of building, that the association intended to change. This was pursued through the so-called "design assistance" scheme dating back to 1907, in which the association's architects were designing simple solid houses, characterized by unpretentious materials and high-quality craftsmanship, incorporating neoclassical moves but allowing for more freedom in terms of decor.

Typical Bedre Byggeskik is a symmetrical, 1\5 floor house made of red brick. The wall length usually starts at 8m, with the height of the first floor at 2.5m and total height of 7-9m. One of the distinctive features of this style is a clay tile covered half-hipped roof, that mimics the shape of traditional thatched roof (Stråtag) and makes the upper floor more spacious. Inside the average-sized house, there's usually 4 rooms on each floor, a fireplace, an attic and a basement. The hall, along with the entrance, is usually located in the middle of the building.

== Criticism ==
Norwegian director Edvard Heiberg criticized the National Association of Better Building Practices for their "dislike for large windows" and ridiculed their outdated view.

Danish author Poul Henningsen and the circle surrounding the magazine Kritisk Revy heaped scorn on Bedre Byggeskik, describing it as "absolute zero of academic architecture".

== Notable members ==
Chairpersons of the association in different periods were: Vilhelm Nielsen (1915-1925), Vilhelm Lorenzen (1926-1933) and Harald Nielsen (1934-1965).

Other members, contributing to popularization, development and function included: Aage Paul-Petersen, Anthon Bendix, Anton Rosen, August Nielsen, Carl Andersen, Carl Brummer, Carl Schiøtz, Cosmus Bræstrup, Daniel Rasmussen, Einar Packness, Einar Ørnsholt, Ejnar Mindedal, Elliot Hjuler, Ernst Petersen, Frederik Kiørboe, Fredrik Appel, Georg Ponsaing, Hans Georg Skovgaard, Hother A. Paludan, Ivar Bentsen, Jens Andreas Foged, Jesper Tvede, Johan Skjoldborg, Johan Speyer, Kai Turin, Knud Tanggaard Seest, Kristoffer Varming, Kristoffer Warming, Lauritz Thaysen, Marius Pedersen, Martin Borch, Martin Nyrop, Morten Skøt, Niels Gotenborg, Niels Westergaard, Ove Funch-Espersen, Peder Gram, P.V. Jensen-Klint, Peter Nielsen, Poul Holsøe, Robert Franz Schmidt, Sylvius Knutzen, Thorkild Henningsen, and Ulrik Plesner.

== Notable examples ==
Marius Pedersen's villa in Holbæk

- Duborg-Skolen
- Frederiksberg Kommunale Funktionærers Boligforening
- Hedehusene railway station
- Kai Nielsen House
- L. A. Ring House

== See also ==
- Arts and Crafts movement
- Deutscher Werkbund
- List of architectural styles
