= Thorkild Henningsen =

Danish architect and critic

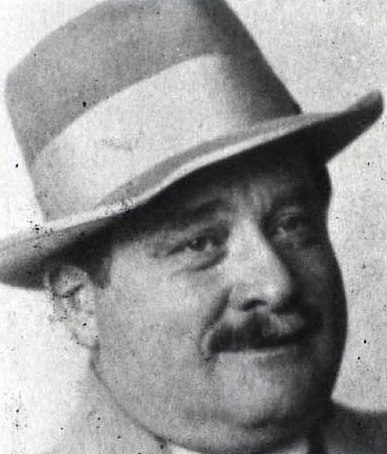
- Born: 7 February 1884; Copenhagen, Denmark
- Died: 27 January 1931 (aged 46); Copenhagen, Denmark
- Education: Royal Danish Academy of Fine Arts (unfinished)
- Occupation: Architect
- Spouse: Grete Ewald
- Parents: Frants Henningsen (father); Thora Vermehren (mother)

Thorkild Henningsen (7 February 1884 – 27 January 1931) was a Danish architect. He is best known for his design of numerous terraced housing developments, especially Bakkehusene at Bellahøj which is listed on the Danish Registry of Protected buildings and Places. In spite of his early death, he also had a significant influence on Danish residential architecture of the 1920s through his work for Landsforeningen Bedre Byggeskik as well as through his writings in newspapers, architectural journals and Kritisk Revy.

== Early life and education ==
Henningsen was born on 7 February 1884 in Copenhagen, the son of painter Frants Henningsen (1850–1908) and Thora Vermehren (1859–1943). He attended Teknisk selskabs skole og Gustav og Sophus Vermehrens Forberedelsesskole before enrolling at the Royal Danish Academy of Fine Arts in 1903. He left the academy after a few years without graduating, and was instead trained in H. Storck's architectural practice. After joining Heinrich Wenck's office, he became part of a group of young, like-minded architects which also included Povl Baumann, Hans Koch and Carl Petersen. They founded Den Frie Arkitektforening in 1909. Henningsen spent 1912–19 in France, working first as a draughtsman for Viggo Dorph-Petersen in Perpignan and later in Paris. During World War I, in Paris, he took part in the Danish Red Cross's work in the city.

== Career ==
Back in Denmark in 1919, Henningsen established his own architectural practice. He was initially also active in Landsforeningen Bedre Byggeskik.

Bakkehusene, a terraced housing development at Bellahøj, designed in collaboration with Ivar Bentsen, was a breakthrough for him. It was followed by a number of similar developments, including the terraces at Saltværksvej (1924), Sundvænget (1925), Bernstorffsvej (1927–28), Damvænget (1928) and Fuglebakken (1928). Other developments consisted of 2- and 3-storey townhouses, such as Østbanegade 33–43, Godthåbsvej 182–220, Store Bakkehuse, Godthåbsvej 260–70 and Vendsysselhus, Vendsysselvej 3–37.

Other works of Hennningsen's include the apartment blocks at Østerbrogade 87–93, Strandboulevarden 8–18 and H. C. Ørsteds Vej 5–7. The villa at Ehlersvej 13 in Hellerup shows the influence of the Neoclassical style that had become popular among his friends by the time he returned from Paris.

Henningsen was also active as a commentator in various newspapers and architectural journals. He wrote for Kritisk Revy in 1926–28.

== Personal life ==
Henningsen married Grete Ewald (23 October 1896 – 11 February 1970), a daughter of the writer Carl Ewald (1856–1908) and Betty Ponsaing (1859–1943), on 5 December 1911 in Copenhagen. He died at the age of only 49 on 27 January 1931 in Copenhagen, and is buried at Vestre Cemetery.
