= Ivar Bentsen =

Danish architect

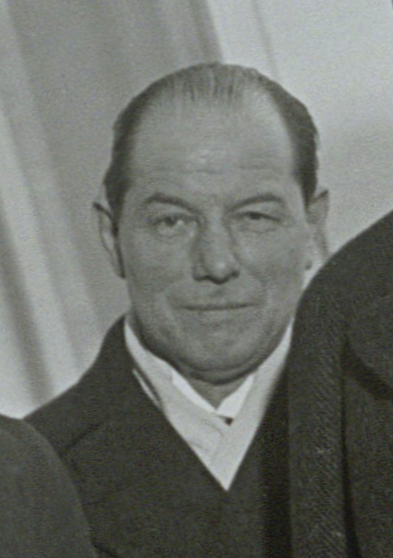
- Born: 13 November 1876; Vallekilde, Denmark
- Died: 21 May 1943 (aged 66); Copenhagen, Denmark
- Occupation: Architect

Signature
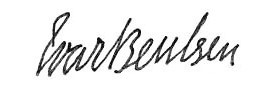

Ivar Bentsen (13 November 1876 – 21 May 1943) was a Danish architect and educator. He was a central figure in the Bedre Byggeskik movement and succeeded Carl Petersen as a professor at the Royal Danish Academy of Fine Arts's School of Architecture in 1923. He was awarded the C. F. Hansen Medal in 1943.

== Early life and education ==
Bentsen was born in Vallekilde, Odsherred, Denmark to Andreas Bentsen (1839–1914) and Emilie S. F. Lavigne (1851–88). His father established a school for master builders at Vallekilde Folk High School. Bentsen completed a carpenter's apprenticeship in 1896 and matriculated from Copenhagen Technical School in 1899. He attended the Royal Danish Academy of Fine Arts from 1900 to 1902 but received most of his training as an architect, draughtsman, and pupil at Peder Vilhelm Jensen-Klint's practice. He later gained experience as a draughtsman and executing architect with the architects Carl Brummer and Ulrik Plesner. Bentsen was part of a circle of young architects and artists including Vilhelm Wanscher, Carl Petersen, Hans Koch, Povl Baumann, Thorkild Henningsen and Kaare Klint. He was a member of Den Fri Arkitektforening from its foundation in 1909, merged as Akademisk Arkitektforening in 2019.

== Career ==
=== Vallekilde and Holbæk ===
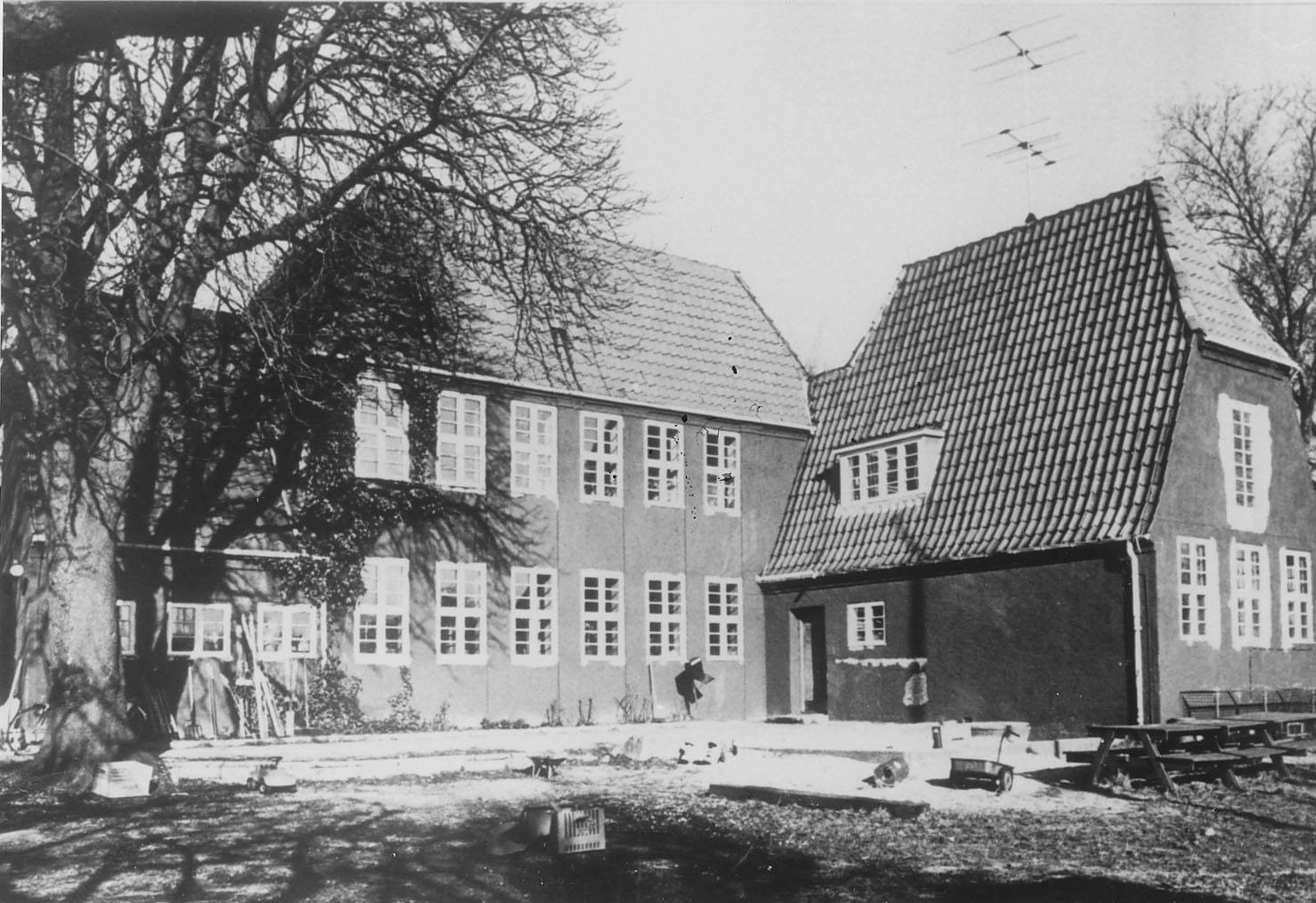
Bentsen's house at Møllevangen 1, Holbæk

Bentsen became the principal of his father's craft school in Vallekilde in 1908–1911. He then founded his own school in Holbæk, which he led from 1913 to 1920. He had designed a house for his own use at Bakkekammen 1 (1912–1913), where he also ran his private architectural practice. Bentsen later designed many other houses in the area, both on Bakkekammen and the adjacent street, Bakkekammen. He was responsible for designing a wide range of other buildings in Holbæk (Odsherred area), including dairies, schools, farm buildings, and private homes. His largest commission was the design of the new North West Zealand Electricity Plant in Svinninge. In 1915, Bentsen was a co-founder of Landsforeningen Bedre Byggeskik.

Bentsen collaborated with Kai Nielsen on the redesign of Nlågårds Plads in Copenhagen. In 1919, he created a proposal for a new opera house and concert hall at the old site of Copenhagen Central Station.

=== Back to Copenhagen ===
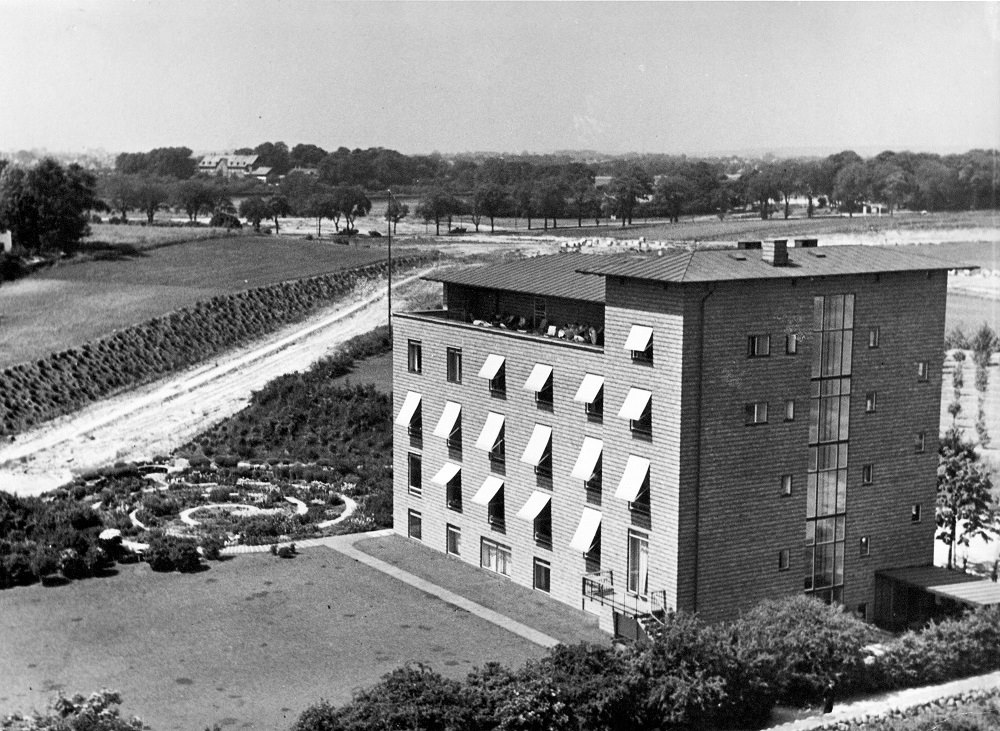
Niels Steensen Memorial Hospital

In 1920 Bentsen returned to Copenhagen to work at the Royal Danish Art Academy's School of Architecture, initially as Carl Petersen's assistant and then, from 1923, succeeding him as a professor. He still focused on residential architecture in his private practice, ranging from single-family detached homes over terraced housing developments (Bakkehusene) to apartment buildings (Kastelshaven). In 1932, he was commissioned to design the Niels Steensen Memorial Hospital, an Insulime Laboratory in Gentofte.

== Personal life and legacy ==
Bentsen married Dagny Jensen on 5 May 1903 in Vallekilde, but this marriage was dissolved. He later married the sculptor Helle Margrethe Jensen Klint, P.V Jensen Klint's daughter, on 8 August 1921. Bentsen was awarded the C. F. Hansen Medal in 1943 but died shortly thereafter. He was buried in Tibirke Cemetery at Tisvildeleje. The street Ivar Bentsen's Vej in Jolbæk is named after him.

== Selected projects ==
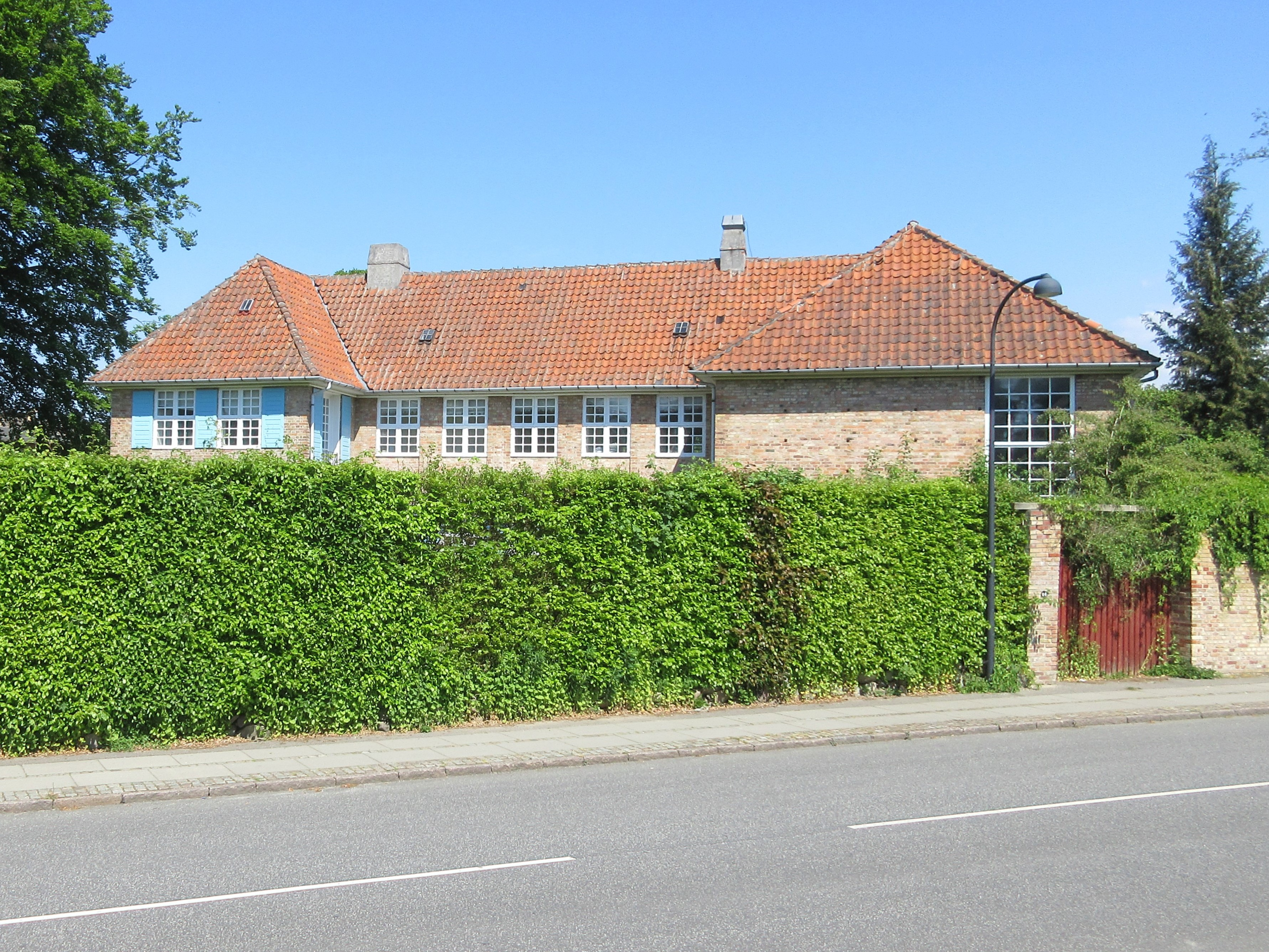
Kai Nielsen House, Ordrup (1916)

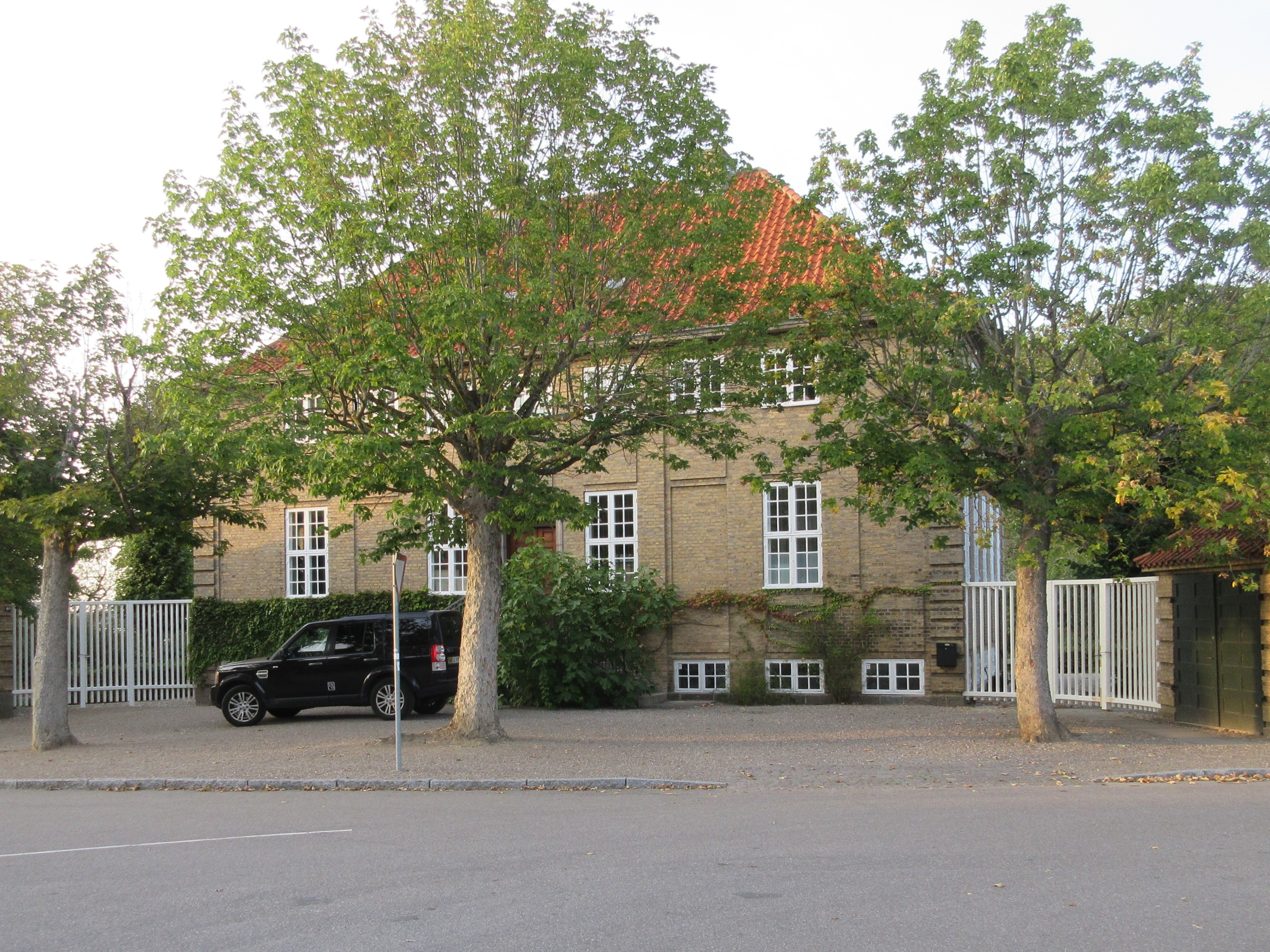
Bakkekammen 40, Holbæk (1917)

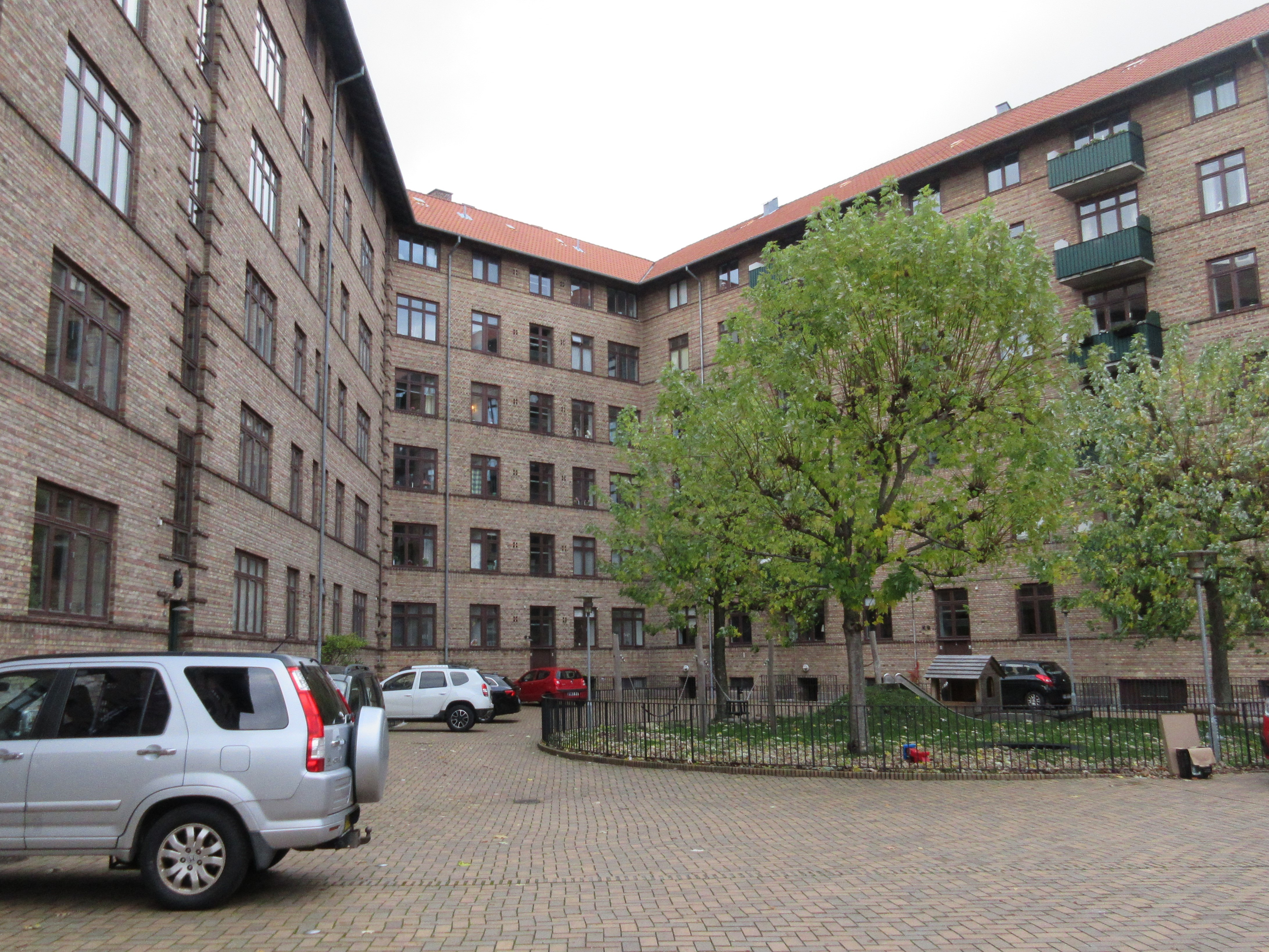
Bakkekammen 40, Holbæk (1937)

- Ivar Bentsen's own house, Kaas Allé 27, Hellerup (1903)
- Vig Skole, Odsherred (1905, altered 2009)
- Forpagterbolig, Torbenfeldts forpagterbolig, Holbæk (1907, demolished in 1976)
- Buildings and adaption of the main building, Vesterbygaard (1907)
- Landinspektørbolig, Svinninge (1908)
- Egehøj Dairy, Føllenslev (1910)
- School, Holbæk (1911)
- Own house, Møllevangen 1, Holbæk (1911–12)
- Gydekilde, Ubby (1912)
- Wiekær, Kelleklinte (1913)
- North-West Zealand Power Station, Svinninge (1913, listed)
- Snoghøj Folk High School (1913)
- Officershusene, Bakkekammen 10–24, Holbæk (1913)
- Møllevangen houses, Holbæk (1913)
- Farmhouse, Hørve (1913)
- Senior citizens' home, Tveje Merløse (1914)
- Kai Nielsen House, Krathusvej 2, Ordrup (1914)
- Askov Nedergård Gudmund Bentsen's Hpise, Askov Højskole (1915)
- Johannes Bjerg House, Aggersvej 4, Skodsborg (1916)
- Blågårds Plads, Nørrebro, Copenhagen (1916, with Kai Nielsen, listed)
- Birkelundgård, Herstedvester (1916)
- Apartment building, Borups Allé/Vestergårdsvej, Copenhagen (1917, with Povl Baumann)
- Tower of Bøvling Valgmenighedskirke (1917, with Marius Pedersen)
- Bakkekammen 40, Holbæk (1917, with Marius Pedersen)
- Butterup Rectory, Butterup (1918, with Marius Pedersen)
- Bakkekammen 27, Holbæk (1919, with Marius Pedersen)
- Vestre Skole, Kalundborgvej, Holbæk (1919, ditto)
- Ubby Forsamlings- og gymnastikhus, Udby (1919, ditto)
- Sømarksvej 27-28-29-30, Studiebyen, Hellerup (1920–24, with Thorkild Henningsen)
- Bakkehusene, Hvidkildevej, Brønshøj (1921–23, with Thorkild Henningsen, listed)
- Apartment building, Hulgårdsvej 1–15, Brønshøj (1921-23 with Thorkild Henningsen, windows changed)
- Diget 24, Holbæk (1922, listed)
- Maritime Monument, Langelinie (1924–28, with Svend Rathsack)
- Rechendorff House, Vingårds Allé 37, Hellerup (1924)
- Sigurd Swane House, Tranegårdsvej 5, Hellerup (1924)
- Kastelshaven, Kastelsvej, Copenhagen (København) Østerbro København (1928, with Peter Nielsen, windows changed)
- Niels Steensen Hospital and Insulin Laboratory, Gentofte (1932, windows changed)
- Blidah Park, Strandvejen, Hellerup, block 1-6 (1934, with Jørgen U. Berg and Acton Bjørn)
- Domus Hagedorn, Gentofte (1934), restored in 2013–14
- Enighedslund, Vesterbro 1–15, Aalborg (1937, with Kooperative Arkitekter)
- Terraced housing development, Vigerslev Allé, Copenhagen (1938-39 with Ole Buhl and T. Miland Petersen)
- Emdrupvænge housing development, Emdrupvej, Copenhagen (1940–45, with Dan Fink, windows changed)

=== Adaptions and restorations ===
- Adaption of Frederiksborg Højskole (1913)
- Adaption of Frederiks Hospital for Danish Design Museum (1921–26, with Thorkild Henningsen and Kaare Klint, completed with Klint)
- Restoration of Kirsten Piils Kilde, Jægersborg Dyrehave (1927)

== See also ==
- List of Danish architects
- Acton Bjørn
