= Memorial Anchor, Copenhagen =

Coordinates: 55°40′50″N 12°35′15″E

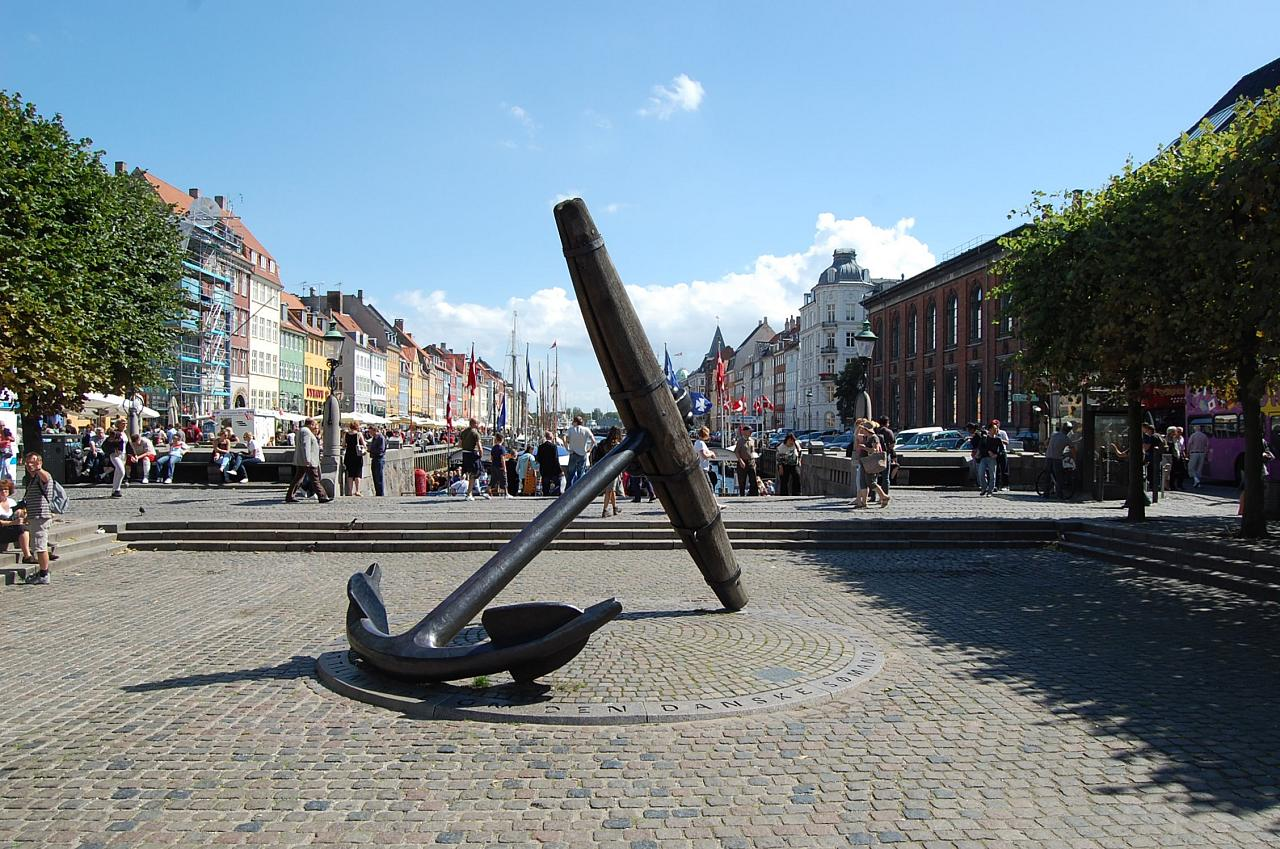
The Memorial Anchor

The Memorial Anchor (Danish: Mindeankret), located at the base of the Nyhavn canal, adjacent to Kongens Nytorv, is a maritime memorial in Copenhagen, Denmark, commemorating the civilian sailors who lost their lives at sea during the Second World War.

== History ==
A 10-metre-tall (33 ft) wooden cross was on 26 September 1945 placed at the site to commemorate the civilian sailors who had lost their lives during the war years 1939–1945. In 1948, it was replaced by a cross in marble.

It was later decided to install a memorial anchor at the site. The anchor came from GDMS Fyn, a naval frigate which had for many years been used as an accommodation ship. One of the driving forces behind the plans was the ship-owner Knud Lauritzen. The memorial anchor was inaugurated on 29 August 1951. Vice admiral Wedel gave a speech at the event.

== Description ==
The anchor is located in the centre of a slightly depressed, cobbled area. It features the monogram of Frederick VII. A lead capsule with the names of 1,600 sailors is buried under the anchor.

== Annual ceremony ==
Every year in the afternoon on Christmas Eve's Day (24 December), the Memorial Anchor is the site of a short ceremony followed by Christmas service in the nearby Sailors' Church. The tradition commenced in 1945 and was, until the mid-1990s, broadcast by DR in connection with the Radioavisen radio news programme, all the years with well-known sports commentator Gunner Nu Hansen as presenter.

== See also ==
- Maritime Monument, Copenhagen
