= Acton Bjørn =

Danish architect and designer (1910–1992)

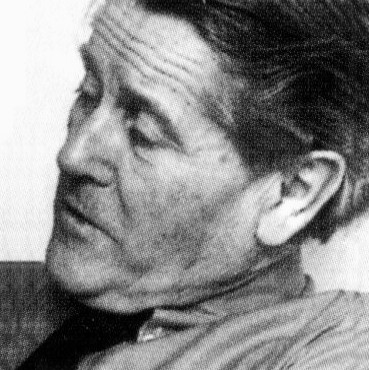
- Born: 23 September 1910; Copenhagen, Denmark
- Died: 20 June 1992 (aged 81); Charlottenlund, Denmark
- Resting place: Gentofte Kirkegård
- Education: Copenhagen Technical College (1926–1930); Kunstakademiets Arkitektskole (1933)
- Occupations: Designer, Architect

Acton Bjørn (23 September 1910 – 20 June 1992) was a Danish architect and designer.

== Biography ==
Bjørn was born on 23 September 1910 in Copenhagen, the son of building painter Ove B. (1880–1959) and Ellen Marie Kjær (1880–1957). He studied at the Technical Society's School and attended the Royal Danish Academy of Fine Arts from 1931 to 1933.

From 1933 until 1934 he worked on Blidah, a housing development in Hellerup, in collaboration with Ivar Bentsen and Jørgen Berg. In 1949, together with Sigvard Bernadotte, he established Scandinavia's first industrial design practice. Employees included Jacob Jensen and Jan Trägårdh.

Their designs included the Margrethe Bowl for Rosti A/S (1955). Bjørn headed the design firm alone from 1966 until 1990.

== Gallery ==
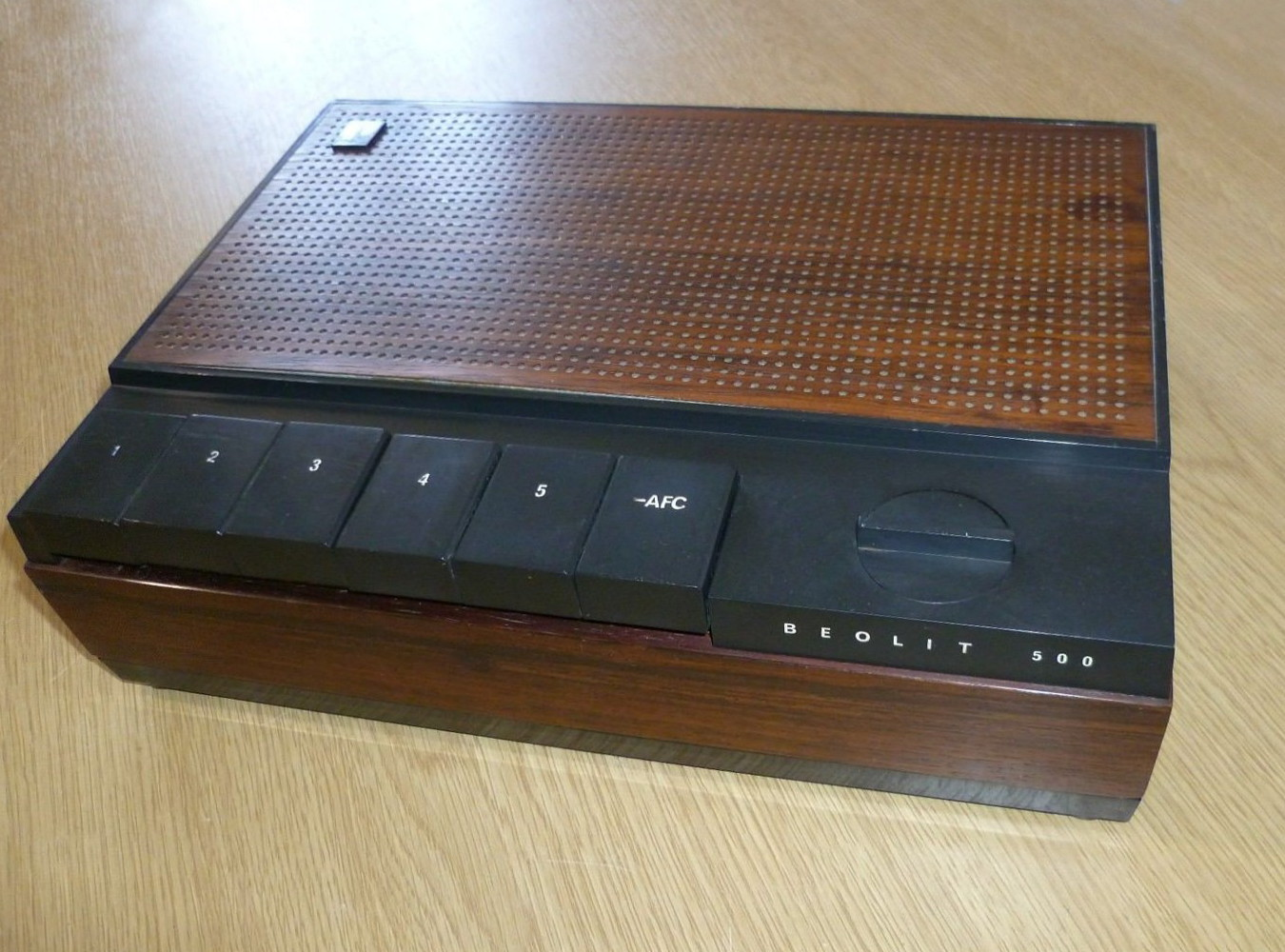
Beolit 500, transistor radio for Bang & Olufsen 1965

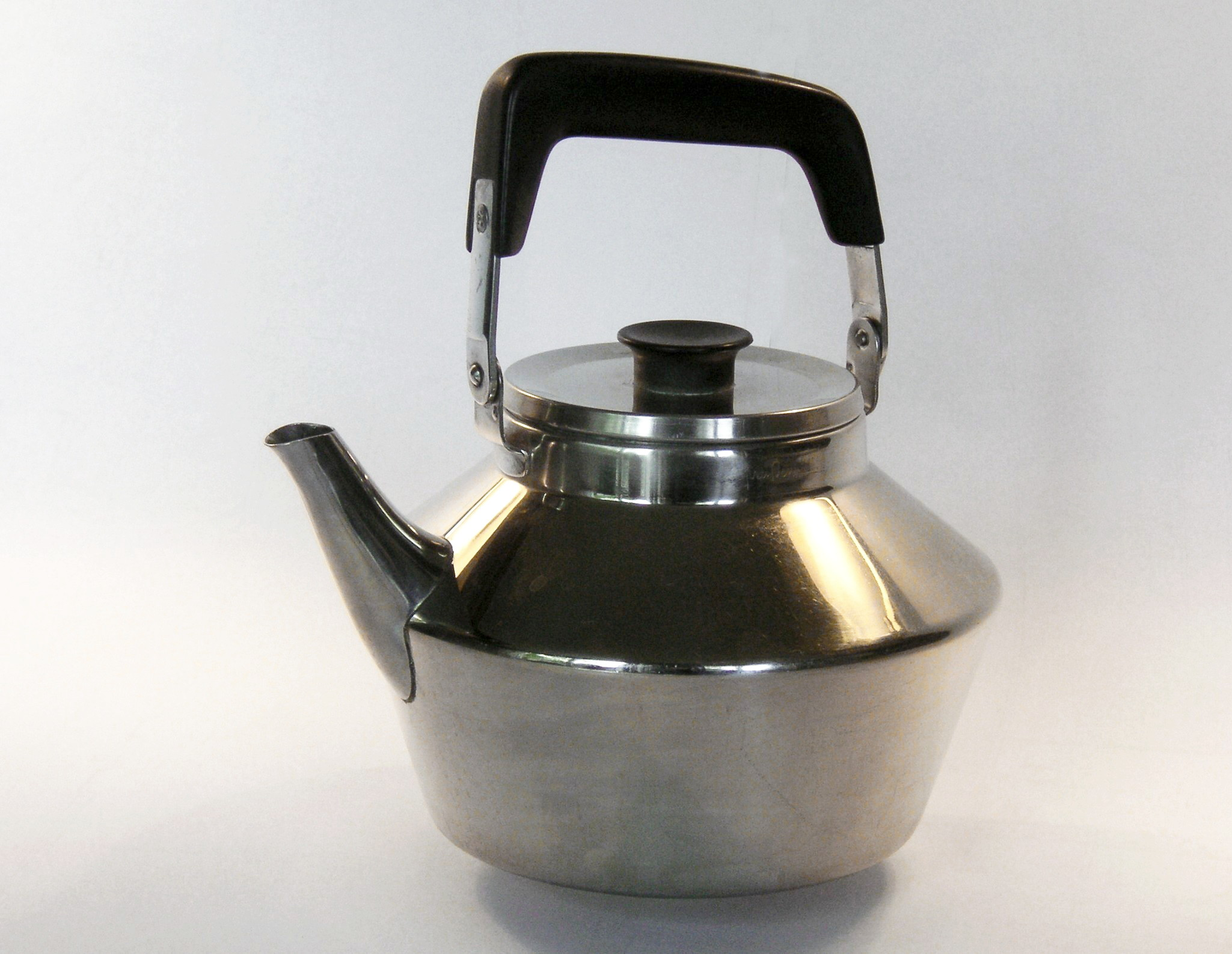
Water kettle for Modernum

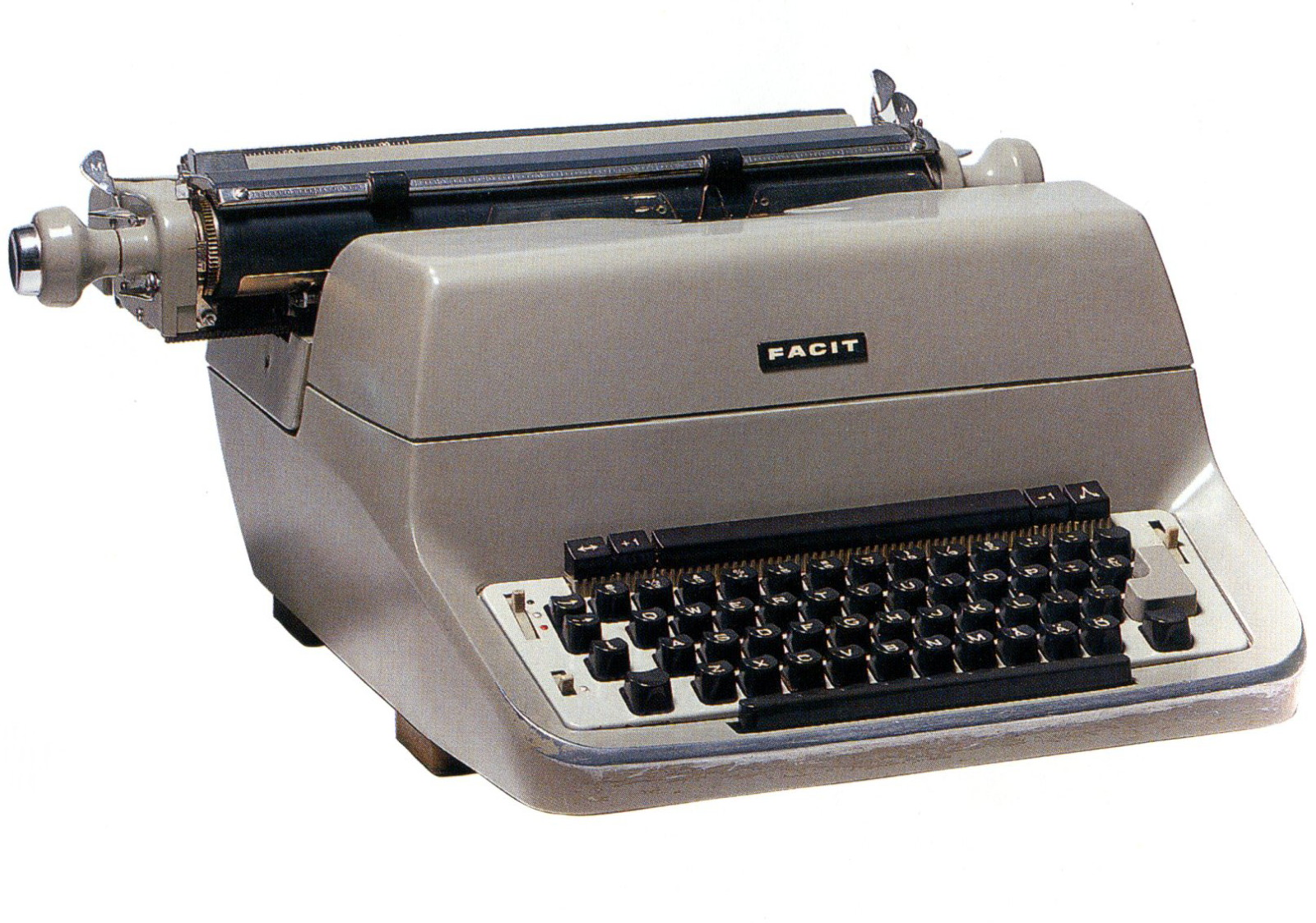
Typewriter for FACIT 1958

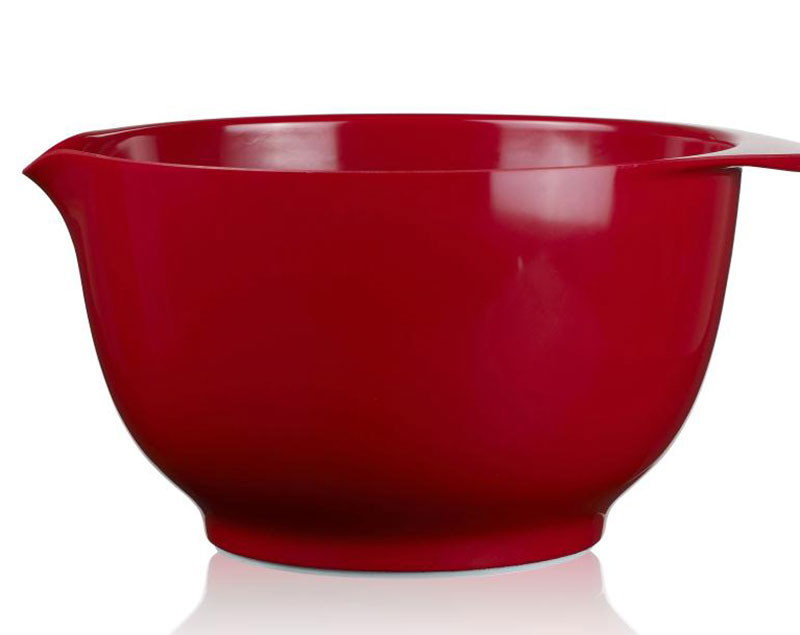
Cooking bowl Margrethe for Rosti 1950

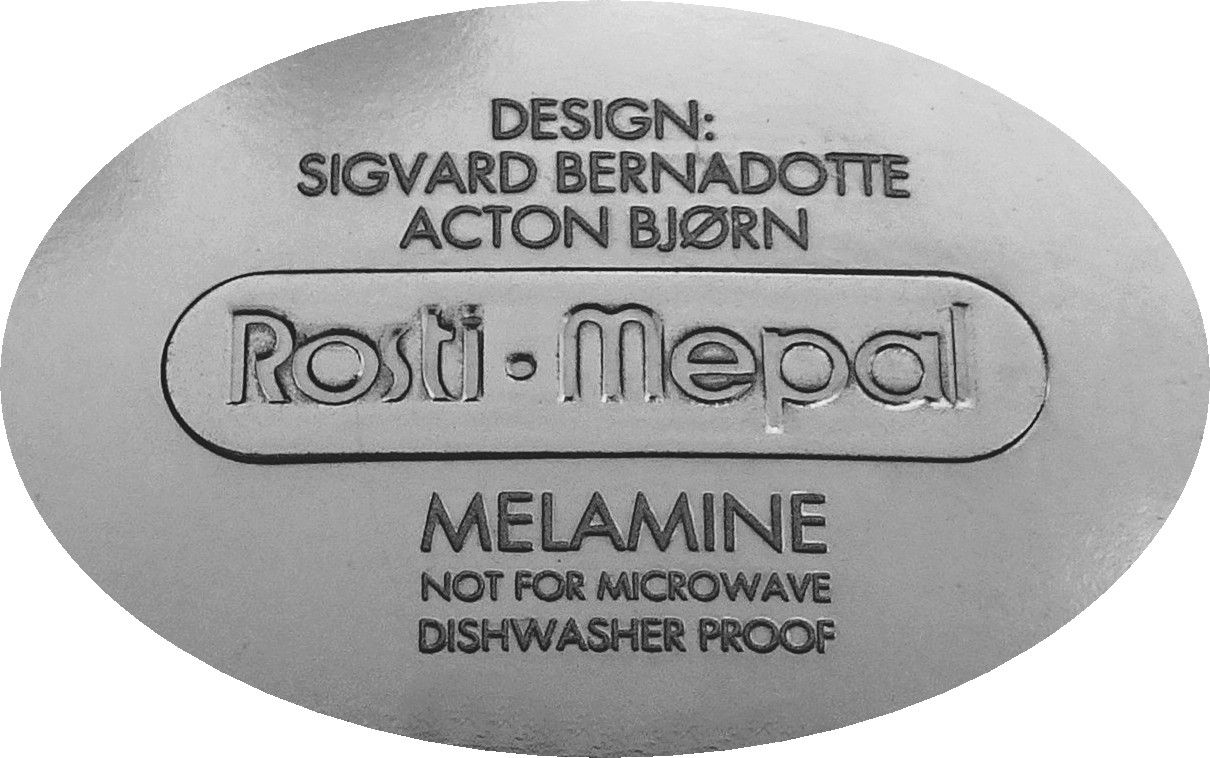
