= Svend Rathsack =

Danish sculptor (1885–1941)

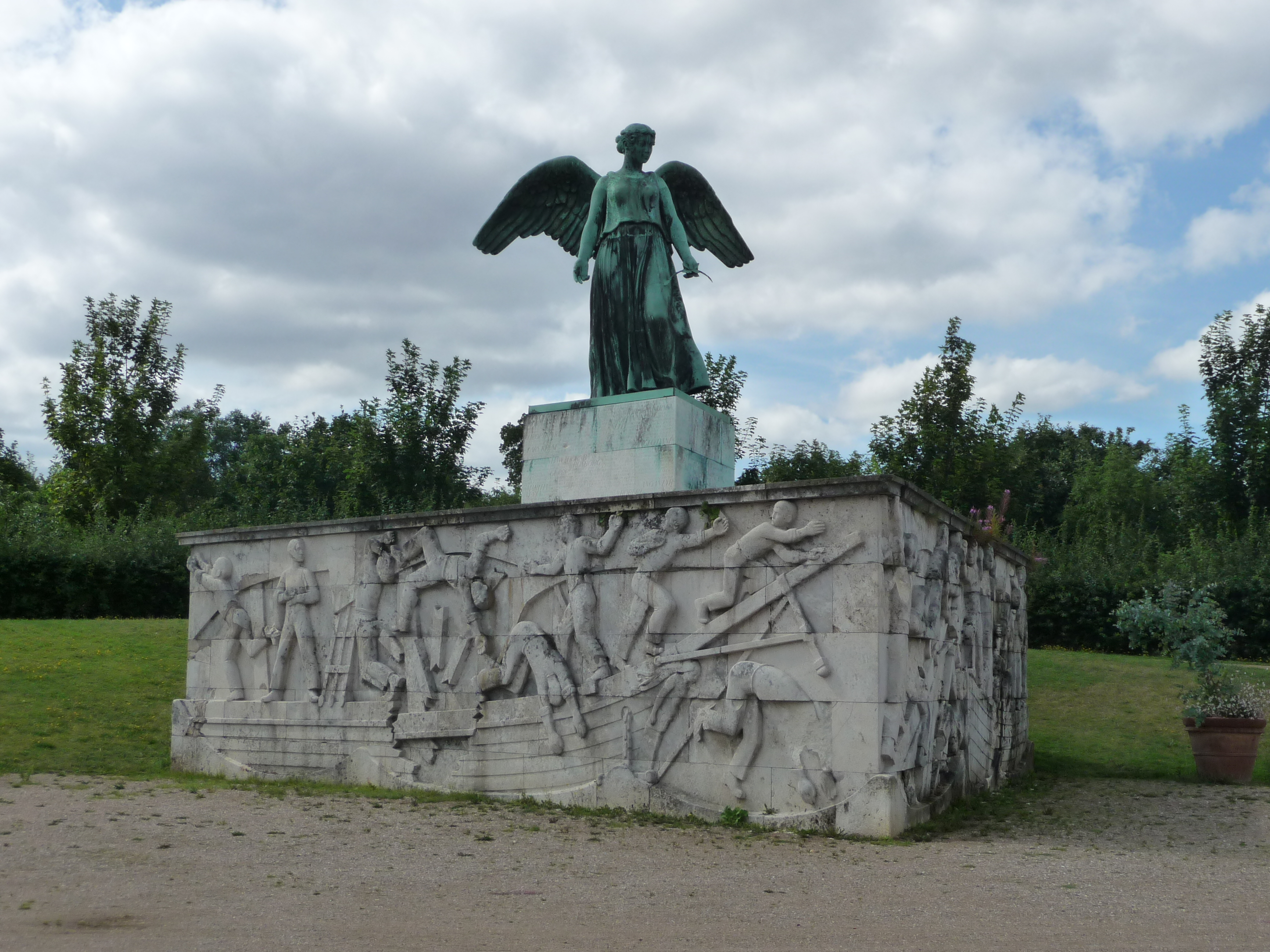
Svend Rathsack with Ivar Bentsen: Maritime Monument, Copenhagen (1928)

Svend Rathsack (8 September 1885 in Fredericia – 14 December 1941 in Frederiksberg) was a Danish sculptor.

== Early life ==
Rathsack studied painting at the Danish Academy (1903–1907) under Otto Bache, Frants Henningsen, August Jerndorff and Viggo Johansen before continuing at the academy's Decoration School until 1911 under Joakim Skovgaard.

== Career ==
After beginning his artistic career as a painter, Rathsack turned exclusively to sculpture in 1913. Adam, his first statue, showns his interest in ancient Greek art which he had developed while studying the Royal Cast Collection (Den_Kongelige_Afstobningssamling). In 1914, while he was in Paris, Rathsack met Johannes Bjerg who became an important influence for him. On returning to Denmark, he crafted works similar to those completed by Bjerg and Einar Utzon-Frank prior to 1920. In 1921, Rathsack travelled to Java where he sculpted a fine black marble bust of Babu Ani.

In 1924, he won a competition for a Maritime Monument on Langelinie, part of Copenhagen's waterfront. The work, which he completed together with Ivar Bentsen, was unveiled in 1928. It consists of a number of narrative reliefs topped by a large winged female figure depicting Memory. He went on to receive several more public commissions, including a monument to the composer Hans Christian Lumbye in the Tivoli Gardens (1930). Built on his own initiative, the Greenland Monument (1938) on Christianshavns Torv in Christianshavn, along with a monument to the Faroe Islands, had been in his thoughts as early as the 1920s. But it was only after a trip to Greenland in 1931 that his plans won the approval of Copenhagen's authorities. The work consists of a Greenlander standing before his kayak, placed high on a pedestal above two groups of working women. Rathsack's last works were the Standing Woman [1940-41] and the Hunter (1941), both testifying to his continuing interest in the possibilities offered by standing figures.

== Awards ==
Rathsack was awarded the Thorvaldsen Medal in 1941.

== See also ==
- Danish sculpture
