= Kai Nielsen House =

Building in Gentofte Municipality, Denmark

- Kai Nielsens Villa
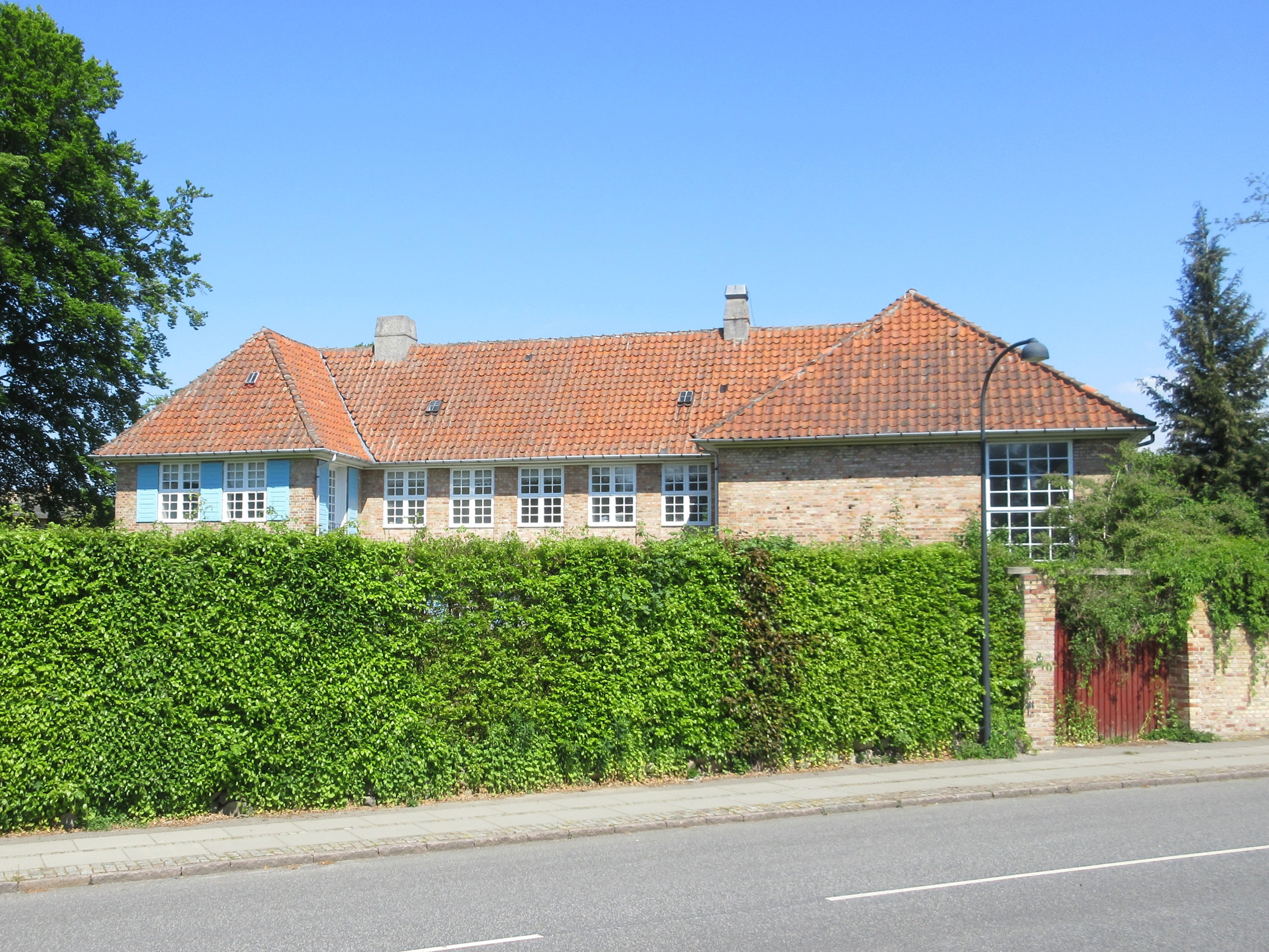

General information
- Location: Gentofte Municipality, Copenhagen, Krathusvej 2, 2920 Charlottenlund, Denmark
- Coordinates: 55°45′58.9″N 12°34′26.11″E
- Completed: 1914
- Renovated: 1916
- Client: Kai Nielsen

Design and construction
- Architect: Ivar Bentsen

The Kai Nielsen House, situated at the corner of Krathusvej (No. 2) and Ørnekulsvej (formerly No. 14), is the former home of Danish sculptor Kai Nielsen in Ordrup north of Copenhagen, Denmark. It was completed in 1916 from a design by Ivar Bentsen. The house and associated studio was listed on the Danish registry of protected buildings and places in 1992.

== History ==
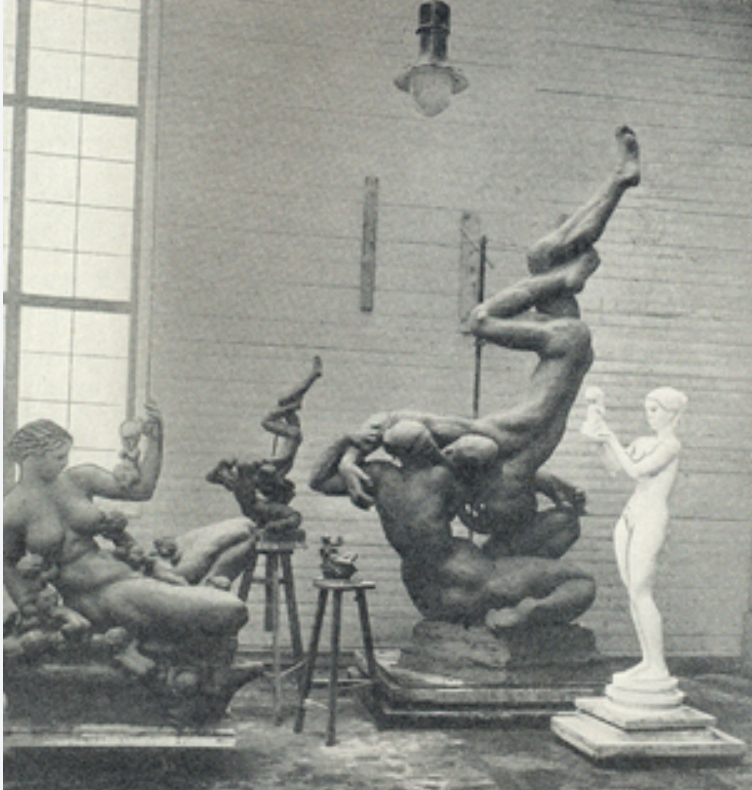
Kai Nielsen's atelier in c. 1920

Kai Nielsen and Ivar Bentson were personal friends. They collaborated on the design of Blågårds Plads in 1912–1915 and Nielsen painted a portrait of Bentson in 1913. The house at Krathusvej 2 in Ordrup Krat was built in 1914–16. Nielsen married his second wife Janna Lange Kielland Holm in July 1915. Their daughter Nina was born in 1917 and their son Yan was born in 1919. Kai Nielsen's atelier was located in part of the building. He died just 41 years old in 1924.

== Architecture ==
The house is an example of the style known as Bedre Byggeskik. Ivar Bentsen was one of the leading figures of the Bedre Byggeskik movement. The style combined inspiration from traditional Danish architecture with inspiration from the Arts and Crafts movement and an emphasized the use of high quality building materials and craftmanship. The combination of yellow brick walls, white-painted windows with shutters and a red tile roof is characteristic of the style. The house is a three-winged building. One of the two side wings contain Nielsen's atelier with double high ceilings, ultramarine blue walls and a window band that runs just below the ceiling. The wall colour is similar to that of the vestibule in Faaborg Museum. Nielsen had designed a large statue of Mads Rasmussen for the room. The wall colour of the atelier had been changed and the ceilings had been lowered but the architectural firm Bertelsen & Scheving Arkitekter completed a restoration of the atelier in 2020.

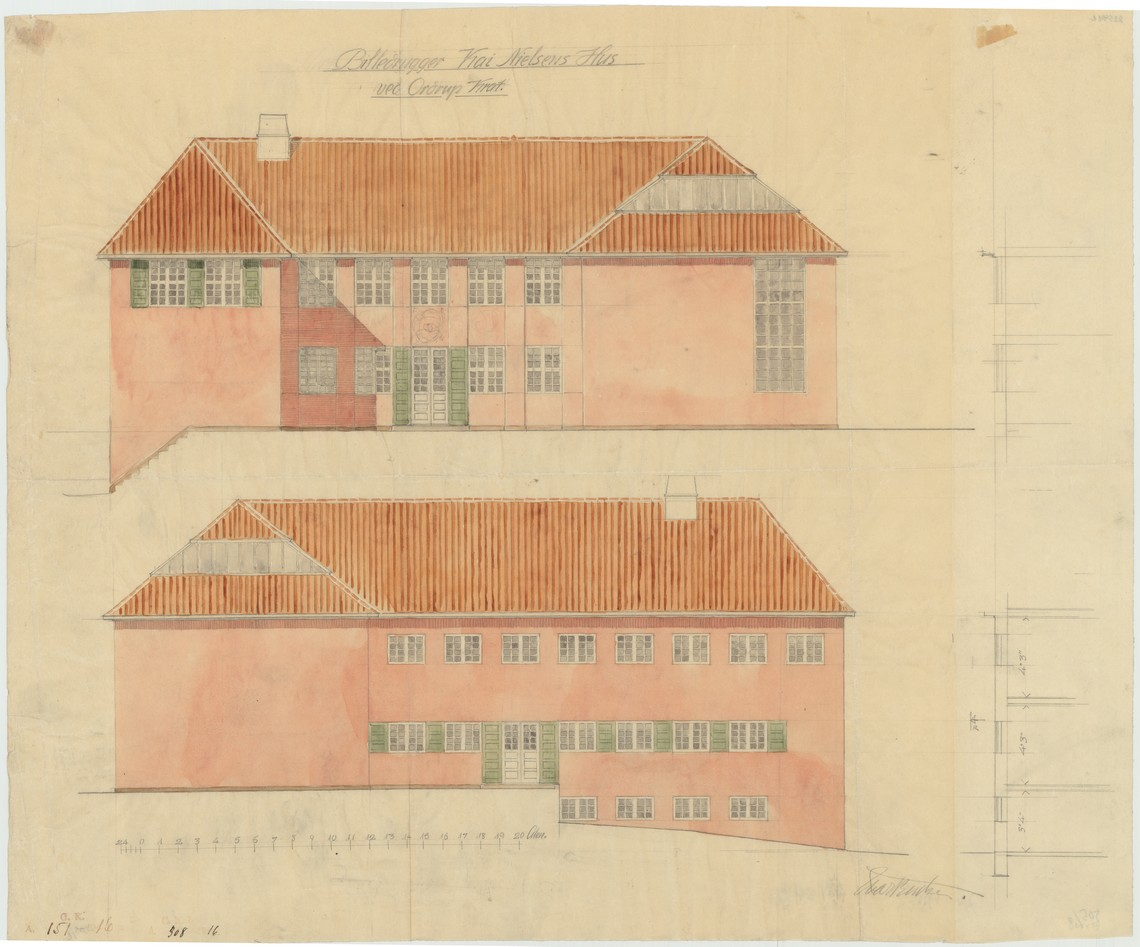

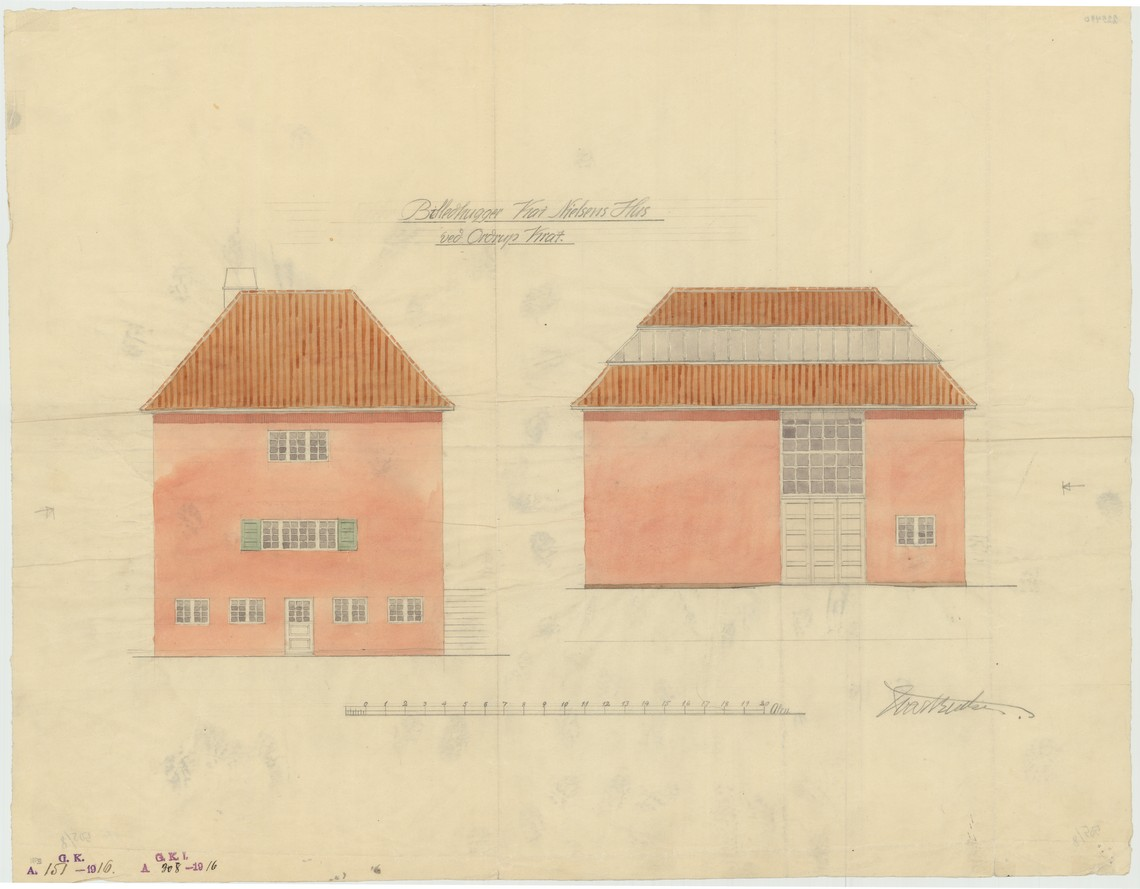

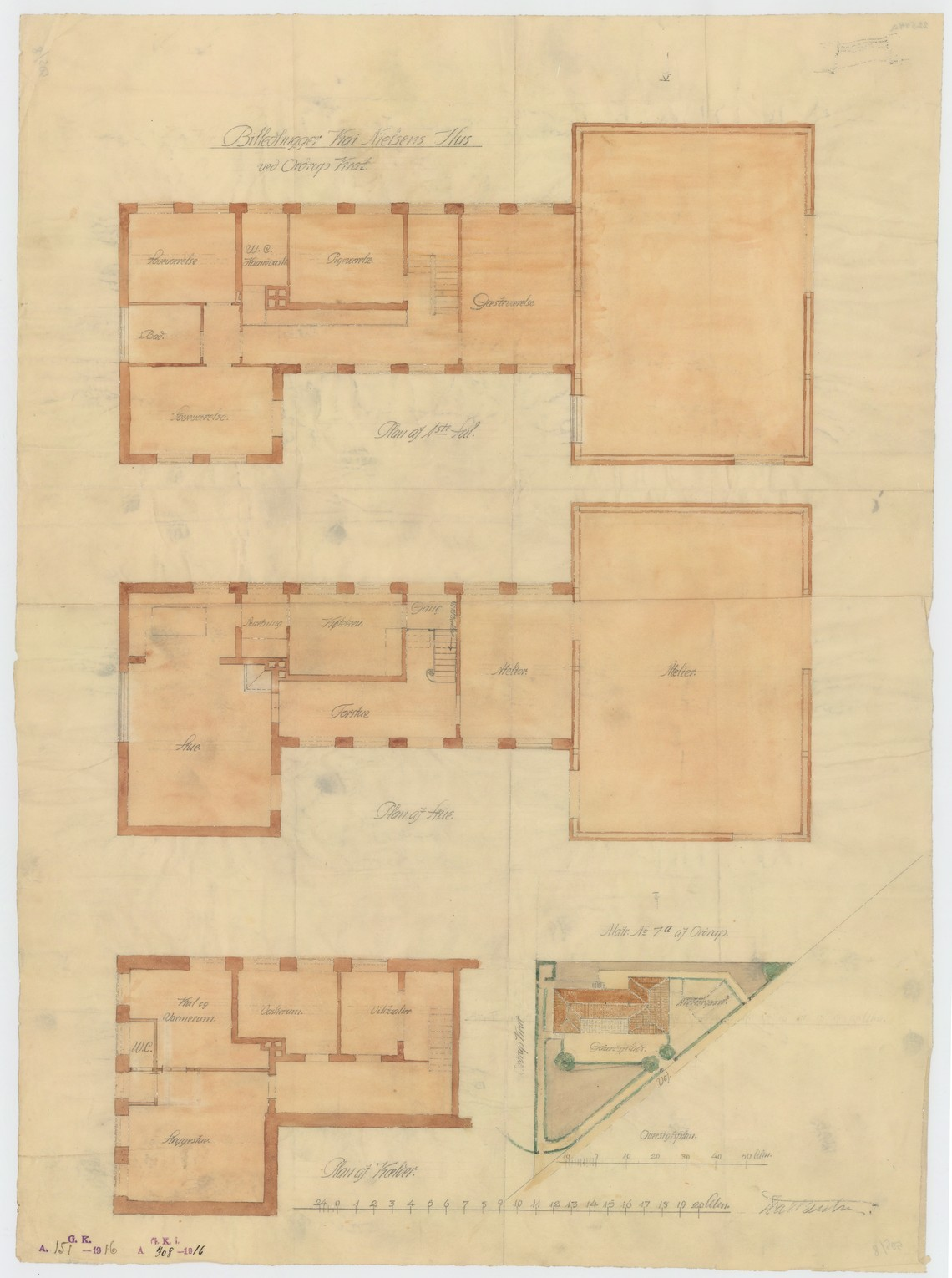

== See also ==
- Rågegården
