= Robert Franz Schmidt =

German physiologist and professor emeritus

Robert Franz Schmidt (16 September 1932 in Ludwigshafen – 13 September 2017) was a German physiologist and professor emeritus. From 1982 until 2000 he was the director of the Institute of Physiology at the University of Würzburg.

== Life ==
Schmidt completed his A-level examinations in 1953 and graduated from the Neusprachliches Gymnasium in Frankenthal. The same year, he began his medical studies at Heidelberg University which he successfully completed in the winter semester of 1958/59. He obtained his first doctorate in medicine on 22 April 1959 in Heidelberg. After completing a medical internship and surgical residency between 1 May 1959 and 31 October 1960 at Heidelberg University and the Bethanien Hospital in Heidelberg, he completed a second doctoral degree program and was awarded a Ph.D. on 21 March 1963 from the Australian National University in Canberra. He obtained his license to practice medicine from the Baden-Württemberg Ministry of the Interior on 8 August 1963 (effective from 14 May 1961).

From 1956 until 1959, he was a doctoral candidate and student assistant at the Heidelberg University Institute of Physiology. From 1960 to 1962, he was a research scholar in the Department of Physiology, Australian National University Canberra, Australia. Subsequently, he worked until 1966 as a scientific assistant at the Heidelberg University Institute of General Physiology.

On 4 June 1964 he received his habilitation in physiology from the Faculty of Medicine at Heidelberg University. In 1966 he was appointed to the scientific advisory board at the 2nd Institute of Physiology at Heidelberg University and was given lifetime tenure.

On 28 January 1970 he was named as an adjunct professor (apl. Professor) by the Faculty of Medicine at Heidelberg University. From 1970 to 1971 he was a Visiting Research Associate Professor in the department of physiology, State University of New York at Buffalo, N.Y., USA. In 1979, he served as Chairman of the German Physiological Society.

From 1971 to 1982 Schmidt worked as professor and director of the Institute of Physiology at Kiel University and from 1982 to 2000 as professor and director of the Institute of Physiology at the University of Würzburg. As of 1 October 2000 he became emeritus Professor of Physiology at the Faculty of Medicine of the University of Würzburg. In 2001, he was awarded an honorary professorship by the Faculty of Medicine of the University of Tübingen.

== Work ==
=== Research ===
From 1956 to 1960, Schmidt's research was devoted to cardiac electrophysiology and pharmacology. From 1960 to 1970, he studied the mechanisms and functions of presynaptic inhibition in the spinal cord, and since 1965 he has studied somatosympathetic interactions. Between 1970 and 1973, his additional areas of research interest included cerebellar physiology, and from 1972 to 1981, receptor characteristics and central connections in fine muscle afferents, and in 2012, the neurophysiology of nociception and pain, especially in relation to joint pain.

His primary research focus has been the characteristics of pain receptors and the processing of signals emanating from them in the spinal cord. Thus, for example, he discovered “sleeping pain receptors” which begin to function only when tissues become inflamed. He also explained the time course and the causes for increased sensitivity of pain receptors in inflamed tissues, such as occurs after sunburn.

=== Teaching ===
Schmidt co-edited and personally wrote a number of textbooks, the best known of which is his textbook, Physiologie des Menschen (Human Physiology). The book is currently in its 32nd edition (eds. Brandes R, Schmidt RF, Lang F), and is considered the standard textbook of physiology in German language. Since 2007 Robert F. Schmidt had been taken on a leading role in the development of patient information and communication systems that can be readily understood by laypersons.

== Awards and Distinctions ==
- 1977 Fellowship from the Japan Society for the Doctorate of Science
- 1985/1986 Academy scholarship from the Volkswagen Foundation
- 1985 Warner-Lambert Lectureship for a Distinguished Foreign Scientist, Society for Neuroscience
- 1987 Selection as a full member, Mainz Academy of Sciences and Literature
- 1990 Hartmann-Müller Prize, Zürich
- 1991 Max Planck Research Prize (for outstanding international scientific collaboration, together with Akio Sato, Tokyo)
- 1993 Adrian-Zottermann Memorial Lecture, Glasgow, Int. Union Physiolog. Sciences
- 1994 German Pain Prize – German research award for pain research and pain therapy
- 1994 Selection as an honorary member of the Colombian Society for the Study of Pain, Bogota, Colombia
- 1996 Doctor of Science honoris causa, University of New South Wales, Sydney, Australia
- 1996 Selection as an honorary member of the Mexican National Academy of Sciences, Mexico City, D.F.
- 1996 Honorary Member, Japan Physiological Society (Selection as an honorary member of the Japanese Physiological Society)
- 1997-2008 Investigador Asociado, Instituto de Neurosciencias, Universidad Miguel Hernándes, San Juan de Alicante, Spain
- 1999 Alexander von Humboldt-J.C. Mutis Prize, awarded by the Spanish Ministry of Culture, Madrid, Spain
- 2000 Selection as honorary member of the German Society for the Study of Pain, Section of the International Association for the Study of Pain (IASP), Hamburg, e.V.,
- 2000 German Federal Cross of Merit First Class, Orders of Merit of the German Federal Republic, Berlin
- 2002 Appointment as honorary member of the German Physiological Society (3 March)
- 2003 Honorary membership in the German Society for Pain Therapy e.V., Oberursel
- 2008 Honorary membership in the Intern. Assoc. for the Study of Pain

== Books by Robert F. Schmidt ==
Some Books of Robert F. Schmidt:

- Robert F. Schmidt: Grundriß der Neurophysiologie Springer-Verlag Berlin · Heidelberg 1972. eBook ISBN 978-3-642-96132-8 doi:10.1007/978-3-642-96132-8
- Robert F. Schmidt and Gerhard Thews: Einführung in die Physiologie des Menschen Springer Berlin, Heidelberg 1976. eBook ISBN 978-3-662-00530-9 doi:10.1007/978-3-662-00530-9
- Niels Birbaumer and Robert F. Schmidt: Biologische Psychologie, 7. ed. Springer, Berlin Heidelberg 2010. ISBN 978-3-540-95937-3. doi:10.1007/978-3-540-95938-0
- Robert F. Schmidt and H.-G. Schaible: Neuro- und Sinnesphysiologie, 5 ed. Springer-Verlag Berlin Heidelberg 2006 978-3-540-29491-7 doi:10.1007/3-540-29491-0
- Robert F. Schmidt Physiologie kompakt Springer-Verlag Berlin Heidelberg 2001. ISBN 978-3-540-41346-2 doi:10.1007/978-3-642-56501-4
- Ralf Brandes, Florian Lang and Robert Franz Schmidt (Hrsg.): Physiologie des Menschen, 32. ed. Springer, Berlin Heidelberg 2019. ISBN 978-3-662-56467-7.doi:10.1007/978-3-662-56468-4
