= Neoclassical =

Neoclassical or neo-classical may refer to:

- Neoclassicism or New Classicism, any of a number of movements in the fine arts, literature, theatre, music, language, and architecture beginning in the 17th century
  - Neoclassical architecture, an architectural style of the 18th and 19th centuries
  - Neoclassical sculpture, a sculptural style of the 18th and 19th centuries
  - New Classical architecture, an overarching movement of contemporary classical architecture in the 21st century
  - in linguistics, a word that is a recent construction from Neo-Latin based on older, classical elements
- Neoclassical ballet, a ballet style which uses traditional ballet vocabulary, but is generally more expansive than the classical structure allowed
- The "Neo-classical period" of painter Pablo Picasso immediately following World War I
- Neoclassical economics, a general approach in economics focusing on the determination of prices, outputs, and income distributions in markets through supply and demand
- Neoclassical realism, theory in international relations
- Neo-classical school (criminology), a school in criminology that continues the traditions of the Classical School within the framework of Right Realism
- Neo-classical theology, another name for process theology, a school of thought influenced by the metaphysical process philosophy of Alfred North Whitehead
- Neoclassical transport is an effect seen in magnetic fusion energy reactors

== Music ==
- Neoclassicism (music), a musical movement of the 20th century particularly popular in the period between the two World Wars
- Neoclassical dark wave, a genre of darkwave music
- Neoclassical metal, a subgenre of heavy metal music influenced by classical music
- Neoclassical new-age music, a subgenre of new age music

== See also ==
- Neoclassic (automobile), a car that is made somewhat in the image of the classic cars of the 1920s and 1930s
