= Duborg-Skolen =

Coordinates: 54°47′41″N 9°25′44″E

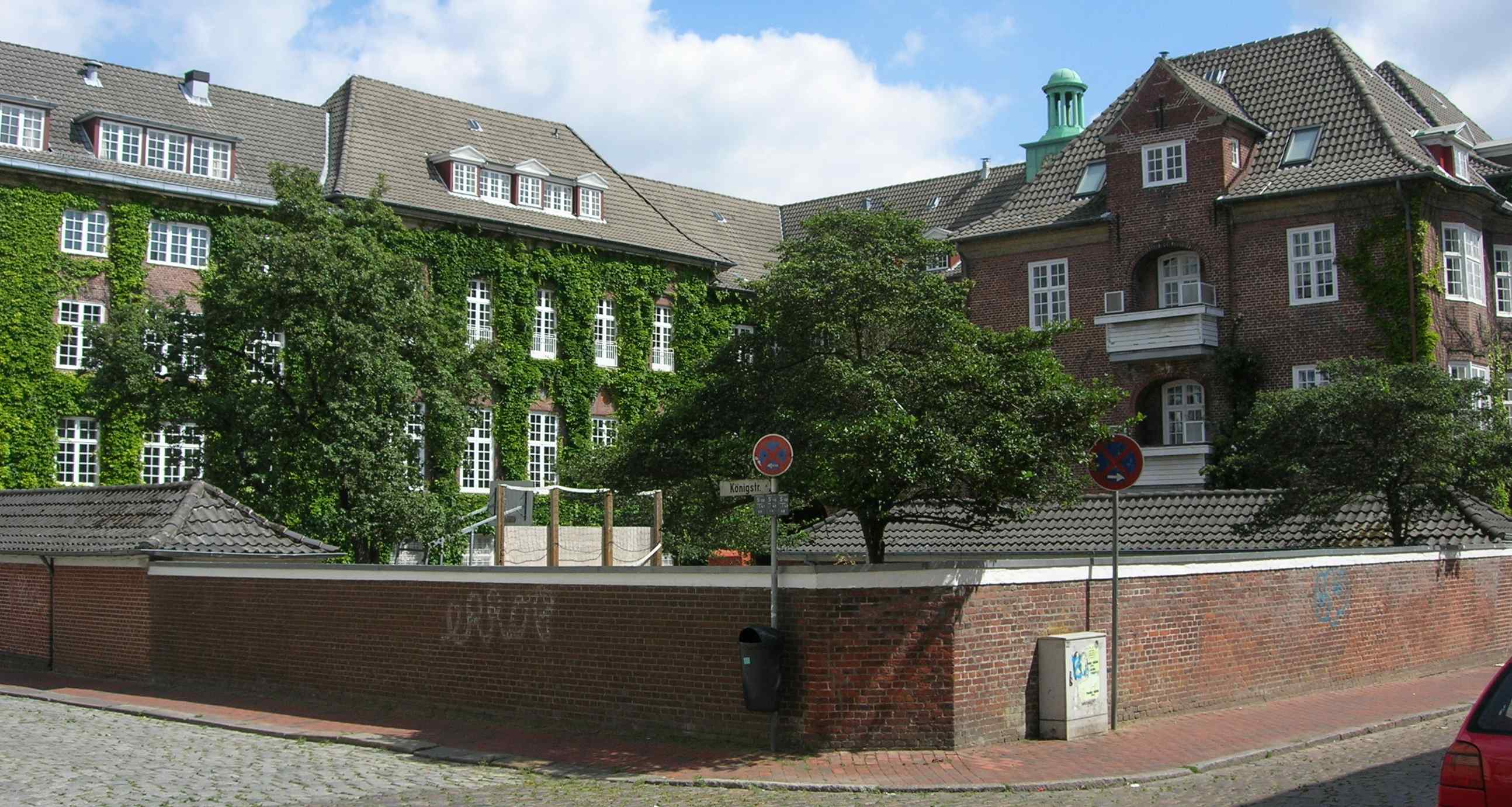
- Ritterstraße 27; 24939 Flensburg; Germany

Information
- Type: Danish non-denominational school with Sixth Form extension in Germany
- Established: 1920. Current buildings: 1924, 1955 and 1979
- Enrollment: 537
- Website: Duborg-Skolen

Duborg-Skolen is a Danish non-denominational secondary school with Sixth Form extension located in Flensburg, Germany. It is one of a number of schools operated by members of the Danish minority of Southern Schleswig, and it is the leading school for this community.

The school teaches both Danish and German at native-speaker level. All other topics are instructed in Danish.

Duborg-Skolen was established in 1924 as a Danish realskole and in 1958 it was recognized as a non-denominational school with Sixth Form extension. The curriculum enables its students to continue education in both Germany and Denmark.

Its buildings are located in the Flensburg district of Duburg (Danish: Duborg), hence the name, and operated by the Dansk Skoleforening for Sydslesvig (Danish School Association for Southern Schleswig).
