= Kritisk Revy =

Danish arts magazine (1926–1928)

- Editor: Poul Henningsen
- Categories: Architecture magazine
- Frequency: Quarterly
- Founded: 1926
- First issue: July 1926
- Final issue: 1928
- Country: Denmark
- Based in: Copenhagen
- Language: Multilingual

Kritisk Revy (Danish: Critical Review) was a quarterly architecture magazine. It was briefly published between 1926 and 1928 in Copenhagen, Denmark. The magazine played a significant role in developing avant-garde culture in Scandinavia in the period between World War I and World War II. It is also the early source for the Danish modern.

== History and profile ==
Kritisk Revy was established in 1926. The first issue appeared in July 1926. The founders were architects and left-wing intellectuals. The headquarters was in Copenhagen. The editor of the magazine was Poul Henningsen. Although three issues were published in the first year, the frequency of Kritisk Revy was quarterly for the following years.

Kritisk Revy contained articles that led to various polemics. These articles were not only written in Danish but also in other languages. The focus of magazine was avant-garde architecture and design. However, the topics were not limited to these subjects in that the magazine covered various topics related to Danish life, including nature preservation, literature and religion. The magazine also embraced a wide range of modern topics, including advertising, shop window design, jazz music, variety theatre and film.

The contributors adopted the notion of art for society's sake. The magazine laid the basis of early Scandinavian modernism. Poul Henningsen developed a new approach towards modernism in the magazine which focused on functionalism, criticism and clarity. It frequently carried articles about the architecture and planning of Copenhagen and other Nordic cities. Significant contributors of Kritisk Revy included Otto Gelsted, Edvard Heiberg and Hans Kirk who would be a member of the Danish Communist Party.

The magazine did not share the political approach of Klingen, a former Danish magazine, but affected from its approach towards European art. This effect was observed in the large format of Kritisk Revy (35.2 x 21.6 cm). In addition, the magazine also included frequent illustrations and graphic formats like Klingen.

The circulation of Kritisk Revy ranged between 1800 and 2000 copies. The magazine ceased publication after the eleventh issue appeared in Christmas 1928 with an announcement that Kritisk Revy accomplished the goals.

== See also ==
- List of avant-garde magazines
- List of magazines in Denmark
