= Listed buildings in Hørsholm Municipality =

This is a list of listed buildings in Hørsholm Municipality, Denmark.

== The list ==
=== 2960 Rungsted Kyst ===
Listing name	Image	Location	Coordinates	Description
Dreyersvej 9		Dreyersvej 9, 2960 Rungsted Kyst	55°53′14.87″N 12°32′24.48″E	House from 1938 designed by Steen Eiler Rasmussen
Piniehøj 20		Piniehøj 20, 2960 Rungsted Kyst	55°52′23.08″N 12°33′9.94″E	House from 1962 designed by Hanne and Poul Kjærholm including the garden wall, driveway and front space
Rungsted Strandvej 68		Rungsted Strandvej 68, 2960 Rungsted Kyst	55°52′32.65″N 12°32′57.91″E	House and garden from 1968 designed by Halldor Gunnløgsson
Rungstedlund		Rungsted Strandvej 111, 2960 Rungsted Kyst	55°53′0.33″N 12°32′36.35″E	One-storey L-shaped building with attached two-storey wing, built in 1680 and adapted in the 19th century
Sophienberg		Rungsted Strandvej 219, 2960 Rungsted Kyst	55°53′58.13″N 12°31′57.95″E	Country house from 1746 by Niels Eigtved (reduced in c. 1800) and garden

=== 2970 Hørsholm ===
Listing name	Image	Location	Coordinates	Description
Doctor's residence		Usserød Kongevej 120, 2970 Hørsholm	55°53′35.46″N 12°29′38.92″E	House dating from 1792 and altered in about 1840
Folehavegård		Folehavevej 125A, 2970 Hørsholm	c. 1770	Main building from c. 1770
Folehavegård		Folehavevej 125A, 2970 Hørsholm	c. 1850	Barn from c. 1850
Folehavegård		Folehavevej 125B, 2970 Hørsholm	c. 1870	Residential building with attached stables from c. 1870
Fuglsangshus		Gl Hovedgade 2, 2970 Hørsholm	55°52′33.8″N 12°29′50.84″E	The half-timbered former residence of the gardener at Hirschholm Palace from 1794, dismantled and rebuilt at the current site in 1979-80
Gammel Hovedgade 3 A		Gl Hovedgade 3A, 2970 Hørsholm	55°52′33.5″N 12°29′49.65″E	House from the 19th century
Gammel Hovedgade 5		Gl Hovedgade 5, 2970 Hørsholm	55°52′34.2″N 12°29′49.53″E	House from the 19th century 1794, dismantled and rebuilt at the current site in 1979-80
Gammel Hovedgade 7		Gl Hovedgade 7, 2970 Hørsholm	55°52′34.77″N 12°29′49.75″E	House built after 1812
Gammel Hovedgade 9		Gl Hovedgade 9, 2970 Hørsholm	55°52′35.77″N 12°29′48.75″E	House from 1806
Hørsholm Local History Museum		Sdr. Jagtvej 2, 2970 Hørsholm	55°52′30.82″N 12°30′10.14″E	Former residence for the estate manager (godsforvalteren) at the Hørsholm crown estate from 1723 designed by crown prince Christian (VI)
Hørsholm Rectory		Sdr. Jagtvej 1, 2970 Hørsholm	1729s	House from the 1720s extended with the three easternmost bays in c. 1880.
Hørsholm Rectory		Sdr. Jagtvej 1, 2970 Hørsholm	1729s	House from the 1720s extended with the three easternmost bays in c. 1880.
Kavalerbygningen		Folehavevej 19, 2970 Hørsholm	1723	Former residential quarters from 1721 associated with Hirschholm Palace.
Mikkelgård		Rungsted Strandvej 302, 2970 Hørsholm	1915	Four-winged house from 1915 designed by Povl Baumann as well as the courtyard and bridge.
Mortenstrupgård		Mortenstrupvej 75, 2970 Hørsholm		Main building with three attached wings built between the late 18th century and 1850, two detached buildings from the 19th century and 1852, respectively, as well as the cobbled courtyard, the stone-lined midden, the stone lining around the garden and the red-leaved European beech.
Mortenstrupgård		Mortenstrupvej 75, 2970 Hørsholm		Main building with three attached wings built between the late 18th century and 1850, two detached buildings from the 19th century and 1852, respectively, as well as the cobbled courtyard, the stone-lined midden, the stone lining around the garden and the red-leaved European beech.
Mortenstrupgård		Mortenstrupvej 75, 2970 Hørsholm		Main building with three attached wings built between the late 18th century and 1850, two detached buildings from the 19th century and 1852, respectively, as well as the cobbled courtyard, the stone-lined midden, the stone lining around the garden and the red-leaved European beech.
Mortenstrupgård		Mortenstrupvej 75, 2970 Hørsholm		Main building with three attached wings built between the late 18th century and 1850, two detached buildings from the 19th century and 1852, respectively, as well as the cobbled courtyard, the stone-lined midden, the stone lining around the garden and the red-leaved European beech.
Mortenstrupgård		Mortenstrupvej 75, 2970 Hørsholm		Main building with three attached wings built between the late 18th century and 1850, two detached buildings from the 19th century and 1852, respectively, as well as the cobbled courtyard, the stone-lined midden, the stone lining around the garden and the red-leaved European beech.
Museum of Hunting and Forestry		Folehavevej 13, 2970 Hørsholm	1739	Stables from 1739 designed by Lauritz de Thjurah.
Museum of Hunting and Forestry		Folehavevej 13, 2970 Hørsholm	1713	Barn from 1713.
Museum of Hunting and Forestry		Folehavevej 13, 2970 Hørsholm	1739	Guard Hussar stables from 1739 designed by Lauritz de Thurah.
Postholdergården		Gl Hovedgade 11, 2970 Hørsholm	1788	House from 1788 and later.
Stolberg Monument		Sdr. Jagtvej 0, 2970 Hørsholm	1766	Monument from 1766 designed by Nicolas-Henri Jardin.
Tingstedgård		Landsbyen 6, 2970 Hørsholm	1766	Four-winged farmhouse of which the residential wing dates from 1759 and was altered in 1834 and the cobbled courtyard.
Tingstedgård		Landsbyen 6, 2970 Hørsholm	1766	Four-winged farmhouse of which the residential wing dates from 1759 and was altered in 1834 and the cobbled courtyard.
Usserød Textile Factory		Lyngsø Alle 3, 2970 Hørsholm		Industrial complex from the 19th and 20th century wing date from 1759 and was altered in 1834 and the cobbled courtyard.
Usserød Textile Factory		Lyngsø Alle 3, 2970 Hørsholm		Industrial complex from the 19th and 20th century wing date from 1759 and was altered in 1834 and the cobbled courtyard.
Usserød Textile Factory		Lyngsø Alle 3, 2970 Hørsholm		Industrial complex from the 19th and 20th century wing date from 1759 and was altered in 1834 and the cobbled courtyard.
Usserød Textile Factory		Lyngsø Alle 3, 2970 Hørsholm		Industrial complex from the 19th and 20th century wing date from 1759 and was altered in 1834 and the cobbled courtyard.
Usserød Textile Factory		Lyngsø Alle 3, 2970 Hørsholm		Industrial complex from the 19th and 20th century wing date from 1759 and was altered in 1834 and the cobbled courtyard.
Usserød Textile Factory		Lyngsø Alle 3, 2970 Hørsholm		Industrial complex from the 19th and 20th century wing date from 1759 and was altered in 1834 and the cobbled courtyard.
Usserød Textile Factory		Lyngsø Alle 3, 2970 Hørsholm		Industrial complex from the 19th and 20th century wing date from 1759 and was altered in 1834 and the cobbled courtyard.
