= Fuglsangshus =

Building in Hørsholm Municipality, Denmark

Coordinates: 55°52′34″N 12°29′51″E

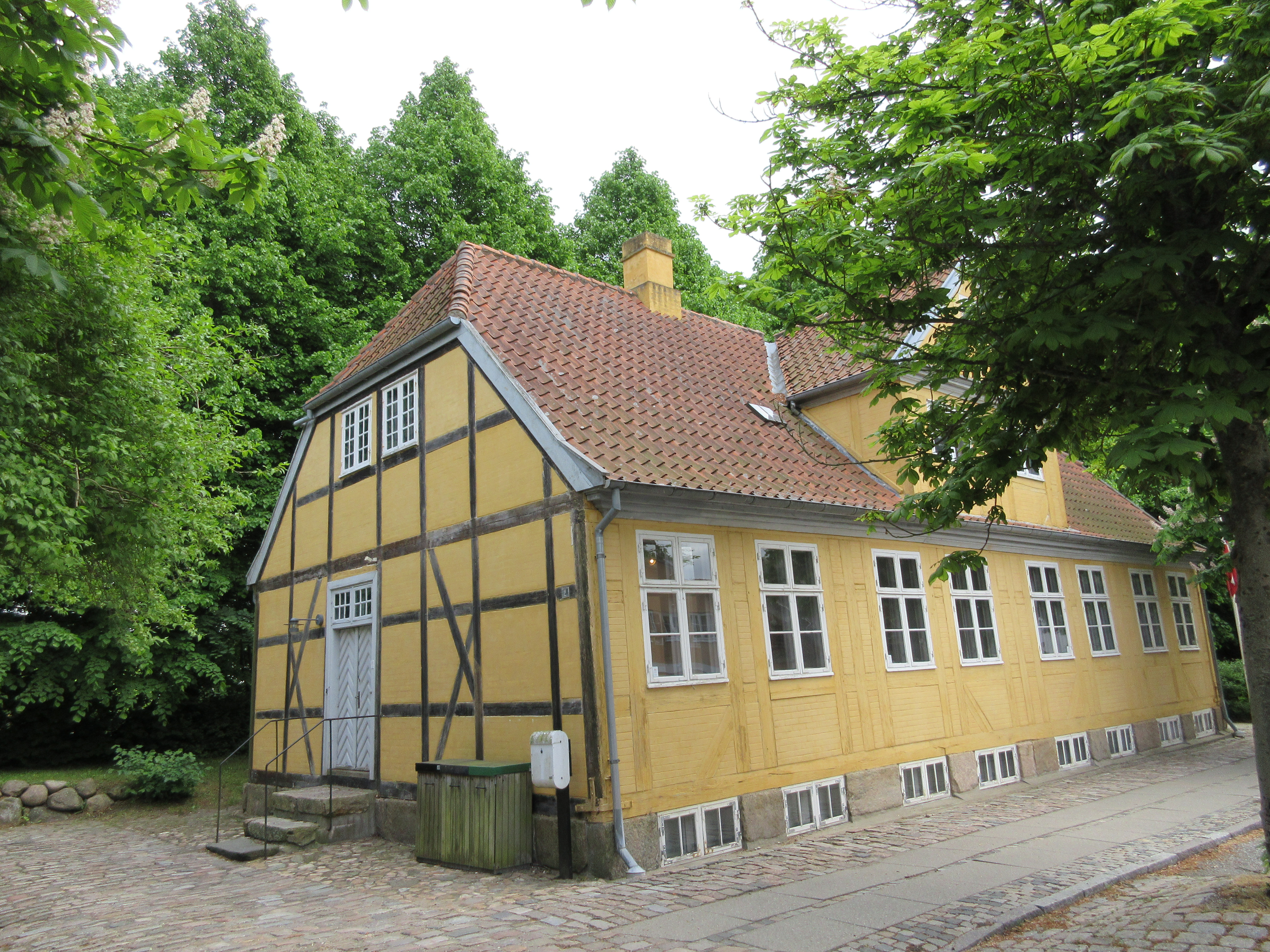
Fuglsangshus

Fuglsangshus, formerly known as Slotsgartnerens (English: The Palace Gardener's House), is a listed, 18th-century house situated on the old main street (Gammel Hovedgade 2) in Hørsholm, Denmark. It is now operated as an exhibition space by Hørsholm Municipality in collaboration with local associations. It was built for the gardener at Hirschholm Palace. The small unimposing house is built with timber framing and has a half-hip tile roof with a wall dormer on each side. It was listed in 1950 but moved 300 as the result of a road extension in the late 1970s.

== History ==
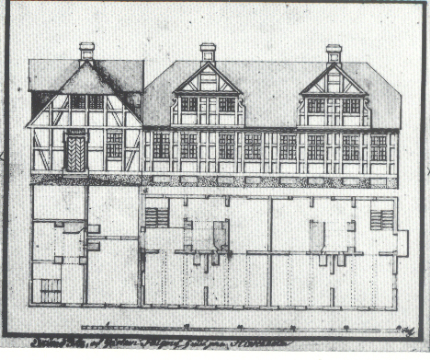
Grund-Ritz af Gärtner Flüggers Huus på Hirschholm.: Not the final design

When Sophie Magdalene of Brandenburg-Kulmbach became queen of Denmark in 1730, her husband, Christian VI, bestowed the extensive Hørsholm Estate to her in compliance with a tradition which had existed since the middle of the 17th century. The royal couple constructed the new Hirschholm Palace on the estate in the 1740s. In the beginning of the 1760s, Queen Sophie Magdalene gave a small piece of land to her palace gardener Johan Tobias Pflügger where he could build a house for his own use. A rendering has been preserved which shows a fairly large house with two dormers on each side. The house was, however, as a result of economic constraints, ultimately built to a somewhat more modest design with only one dormer on each side.

In Fuglsangshus was listed in 1950. In the early 1950s, it was proposed to move the building in connection with a possible extension of Rungstedvej. The plans were put on hold but revived in 1974 and 1 June 1976 was chosen as the deadline for removing the house. It was carefully registered and dismantled and initially put on storage in Hørsholm Local History Museum and at Mortenstrupgård. A site at Hørsholm's old main street (Gammel Govedgade) was selected as the new home of the building, reconstruction began in December 1978 and was completed in December 1980.

== Exhibitions ==
The house is now used as a venue for special exhibitions arranged by Hørsholm Municipality's three art societies.

== See also ==
- Listed buildings in Hørsholm Municipality
