= Jette Baagøe =

Botanist

- Born: Jette Svendsen; 1946 (age 79–80); Ringsted, Denmark
- Education: University of Copenhagen
- Occupation: scientist
- Spouse: Ib Welling
- Children: 1

Jette Baagøe (née Svendsen, born 1946) is the director of the Danish Museum of Hunting and Forestry in Hørsholm where she has worked since 1984. She headed the steering group that began work on the nomination of The par force hunting landscape in North Zealand, which was inscribed on the UNESCO World Heritage List on 4 July 2015.

== Biography ==
Baagøe studied at the University of Copenhagen, graduating in botany, zoology, geology and geography in 1973 with a PhD in botany in 1976. In addition to her museum work, she headed the now defunct Federikborg Cultural Environment Council and has served as a member of the Danish branch of the International Council for Game and Wildlife Conservation (CIC). She has written and lectured on par force hunting in Denmark, on the Jægersborg Dyrehave and on how forests were depicted during the Golden Age of Danish Painting.

As director, she hopes to modernize the Danish Museum of Hunting and Forestry and simplify its name. She believes it should have a broader mandate covering man's relationship with nature. She is especially interested in the unique network of forest roads in the area which were used for par force hunting by the Danish kings in the 17th and 18th centuries and now expects the museum will benefit from the recent UNESCO heritage listing. Although the listing is under cultural heritage rather than nature, Baagøe hopes it will result in full protection of the forests themselves.

== Personal life ==
Jette Baagøe was born and raised in Ringsted and now lives in Lyngby. She is married to Ib Welling and together they have one child Snorre Welling.

== Awards ==
Baagøe has received several awards for her work including the Order of the Dannebrog in 1998.

== Works ==
Baggøe's works include:

- Agger, Peder; Baagøe, Jette; Hamann, Ole; Primdahl, Jørgen (2000). Dansk naturpolitik - visioner og anbefalinger: vismandsrapport 2000 00 (in Danish). Naturrådet. ISBN 978-87-601-8817-6.
- Baagøe, Jette (2014). Nomination of the Par Force Hunting Landscape in North Zealand: For Inclusion on the World Heritage List. Danish Museum of Hunting and Forestry. ISBN 978-87-984051-1-5.
- Baagøe, Jette (1998). ... det står ned brede bøge...: særudstilling i anledning af Guldalderfestival 1998 : katalog (in Danish). Dansk Jagt- og Skovbrugsmuseum.
