= Par force hunting landscape in North Zealand =

World Heritage site in Denmark

The par force hunting landscape in North Zealand
UNESCO World Heritage Site
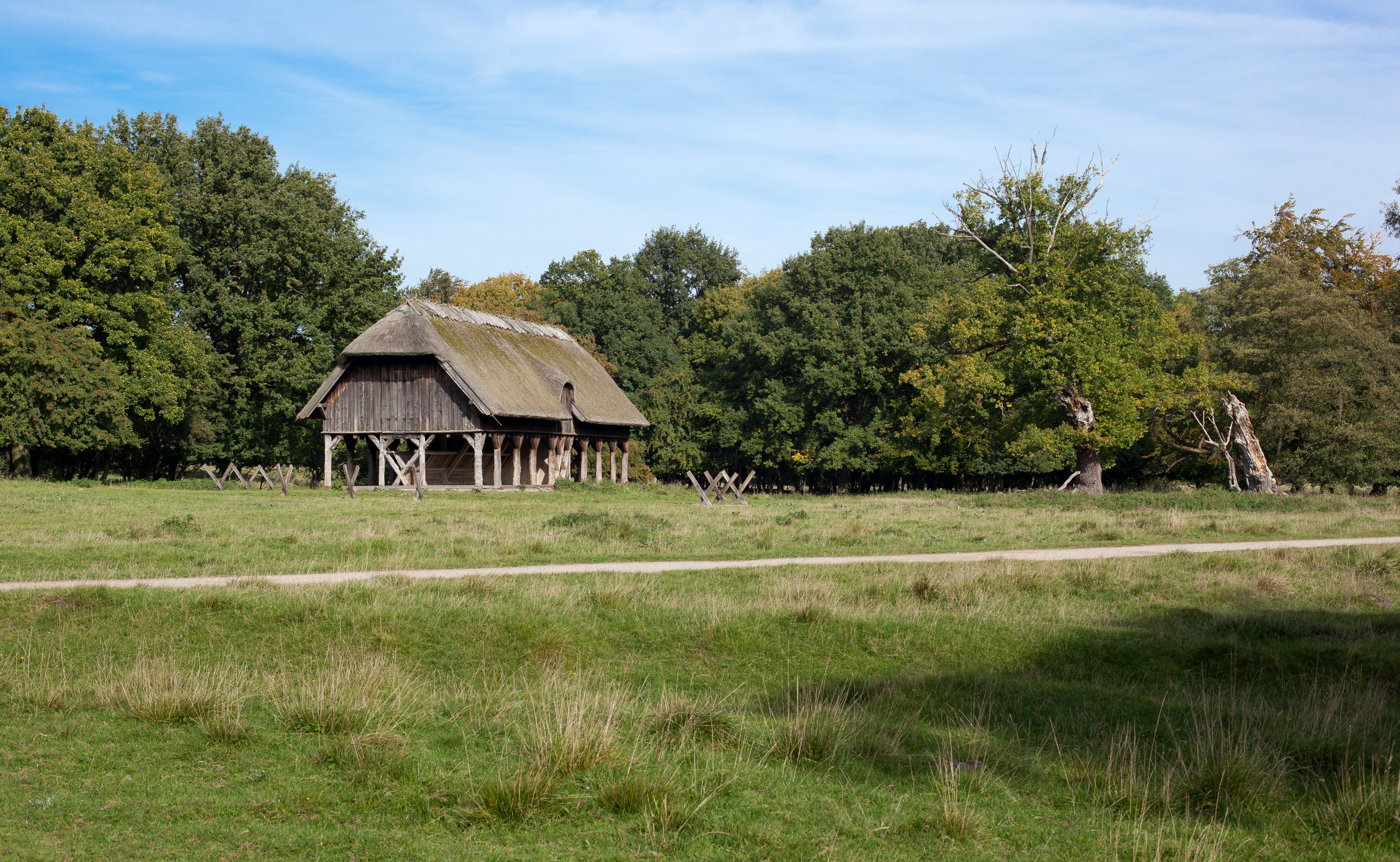
- Feeding station in Jægersborg Dyrehave

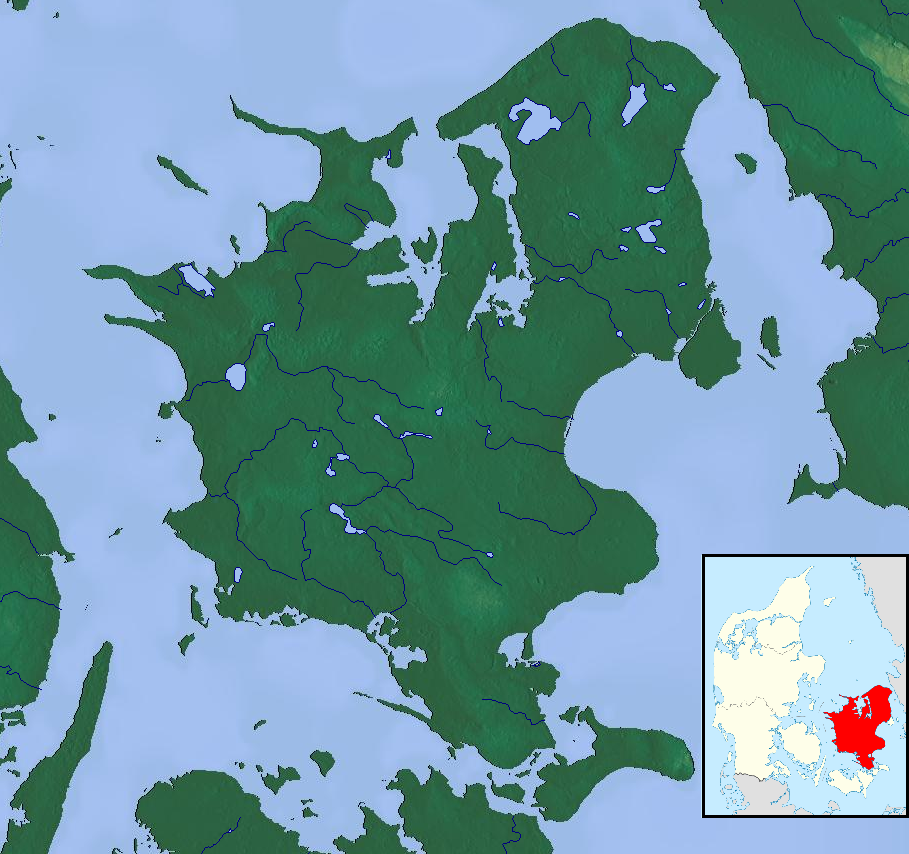
- Location within Zealand Location within Denmark
- Location: North Zealand, Denmark
- Criteria: Cultural: (ii), (iv)
- Reference: 1469
- Inscription: 2015 (39th Session)
- Area: 4,543 ha (11,230 acres)
- Buffer zone: 1,612.7 ha (3,985 acres)
- Coordinates: 55°54′49″N 12°21′28″E

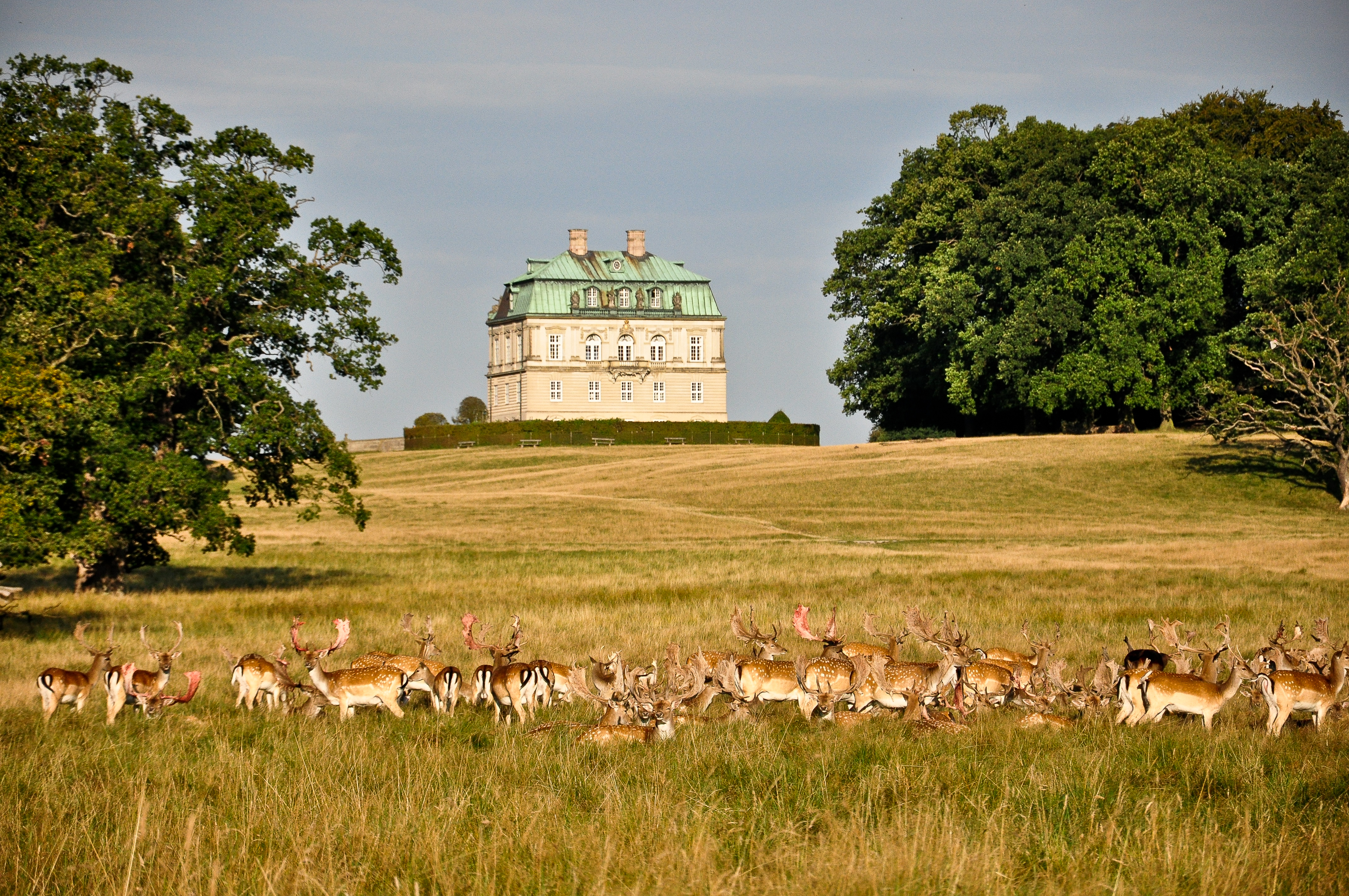
Deer at the Hermitage Lodge in Jægersborg Dyrehave

The Par force hunting landscape in North Zealand is a collection of hunting grounds and forests north of Copenhagen. The landscape was submitted for admission to the UNESCO List of World Heritage Sites on 1 August 2010 and was inscribed on 4 July 2015. The landscape comprises three main areas: Store Dyrehave, Gribskov and Jægersborg Dyrehave/Jægersborg Hegn, and contains the most significant hunting grounds for the medieval nobility in Denmark. The central-star grid design of the landscape, with numbered roads and stone posts, fences, demonstrates the unique planning and design of hunting landscapes in the 17th and 18th centuries.

== Location ==
The three forests are all located in the North Zealand peninsula to the north of Copenhagen. Jægersborg Dyrehave with the fenced Jægersborg Hegn is closest to the capital on the peninsula's east coast. The square-shaped Store Dyrehave is located further to the north in the centre of the peninsula while Gribskov, further north still, is adjacent to Esrum Sø. Store Dyrehave and Gribskov are not far from Frederiksborg Palace and the town of Hillerød

== Background ==
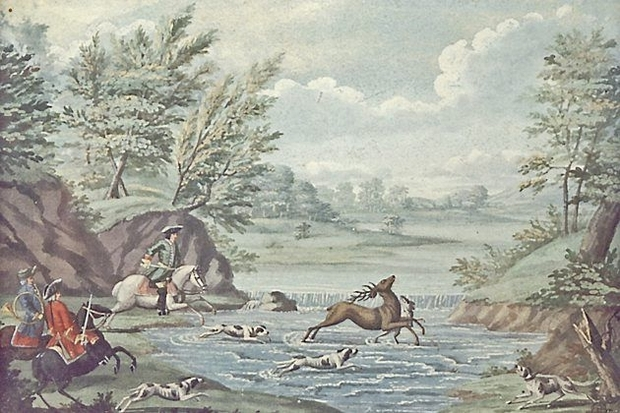
Par force hunting in North Zealand c. 1750, watercolour by Johan Jacob Bruun

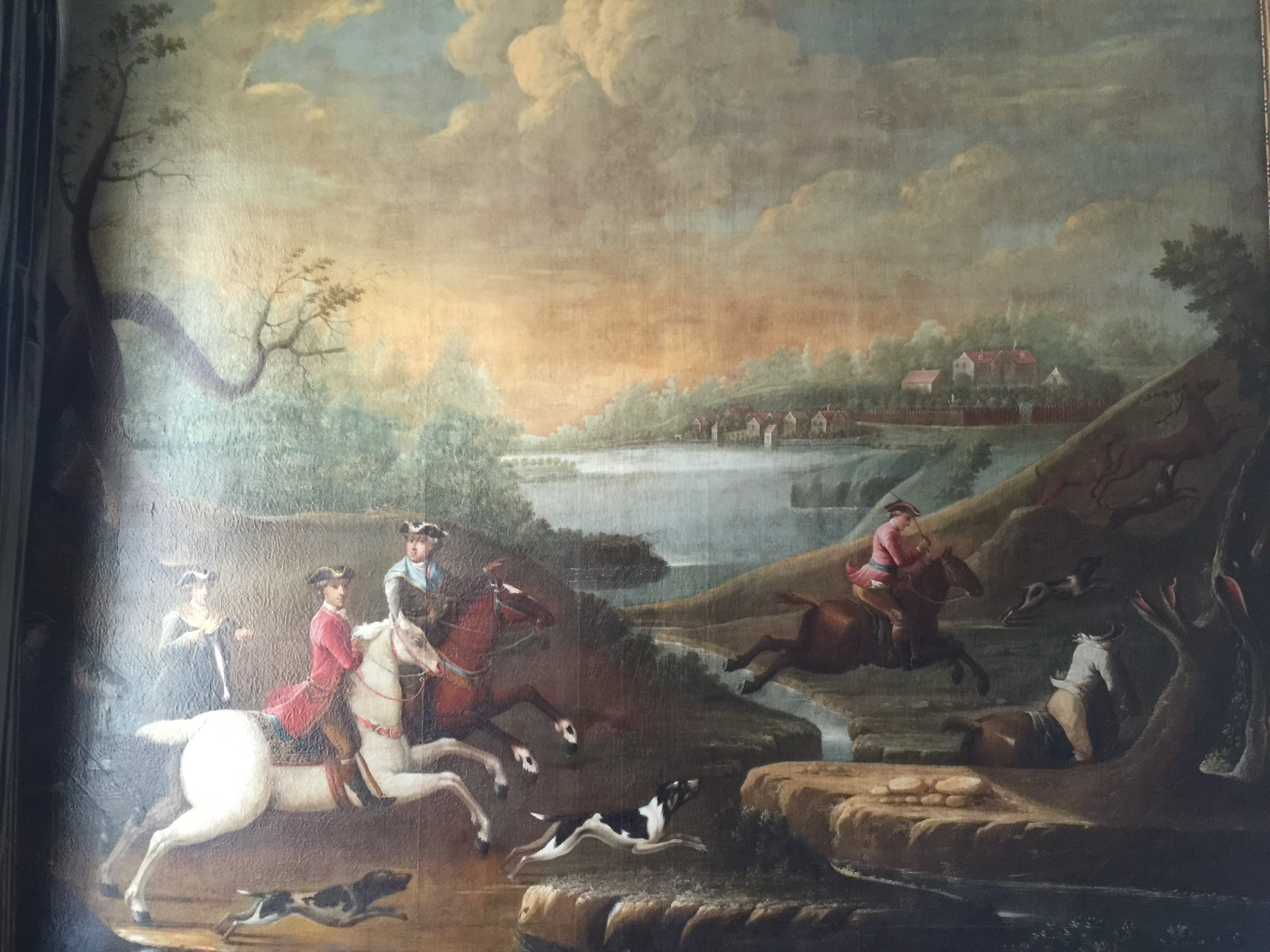
King Christian VII on a par force hunt

The forests and related buildings in three locations to the north of Copenhagen formed parts of a well-preserved Baroque hunting landscape designed in the late 17th and early 18th centuries for the Danish monarchs to participate in par force hunting. The history of the area for hunting dates back to the Middle Ages when the Danish kings, the church and noblemen had estates and hunting grounds in the peninsula's hilly forests and undulating farmlands. In connection with the Danish Reformation, in 1536 King Frederick II confiscated the estates belonging to the Catholic Church. From 1560, the various estates were merged in order to establish an extensive royal hunting park across the North Zealand peninsula. It was, however King Christian V who, from 1670, put his army to work on creating a par force deer park around Ibstrup Castle. In his youth, the king had experienced par force hunting in France's forest of Saint-Germain-en-Laye. He then imported hounds and huntsmen from England, renaming the castle Jægersborg (hunter's castle) and the estate Jægersborg Dyrehave (Jægersborg deer park).

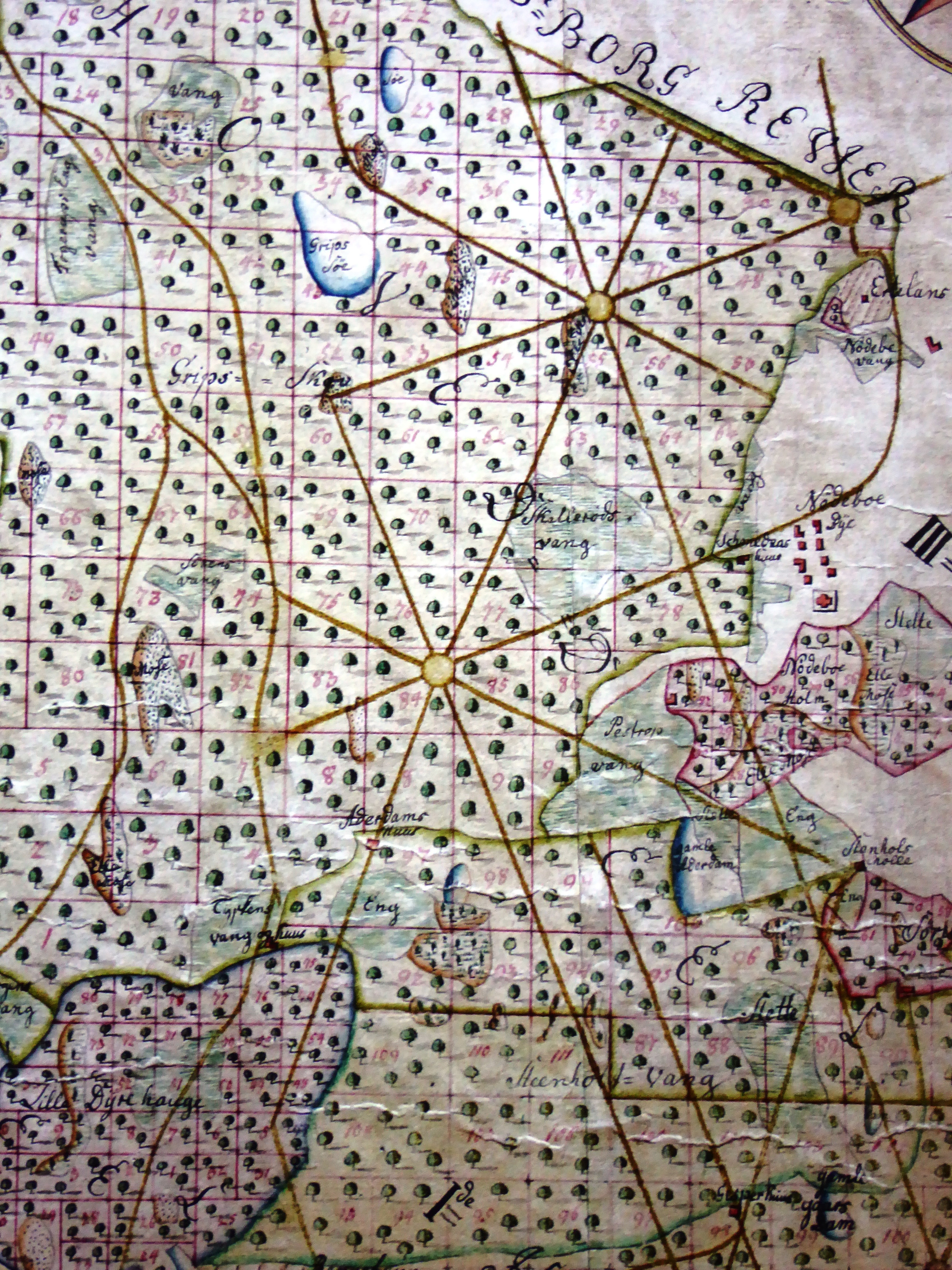
Detail from old map showing the par force hunt road network in Gribskov with two eight-way junctions

One of the most important aspects of the par force hunt was that it provided a basis for demonstrating the absolute power of the monarch by developing connecting roads across the landscape. The entire North Zealand peninsula area was patterned with a Cartesian-based road system consisting of stars surrounded by distinct squares. Stone posts indicated whether roads led towards or away from the centre of the star. The mathematical approach reinforced the king's image as a representative of reason in line with Baroque ideals. The Danish orthogonal geometry of the road systems was an improvement on the star-shaped grids used in France and Germany as it provided equal access to all parts of the forest.

The Jægersborg hunting park contained no star-shaped road networks but was instead based on the presence of a royal hunting lodge, initially known as the Hermitage or Hubertus House. In 1736, it was rebuilt in Baroque style as Ermitageslottet or the Hermitage Hunting Lodge, with a grand view over the surrounding landscape from its hilltop location.

== Danish Museum of Hunting and Forestry ==
Much of the preparatory work on the UNESCO nomination was undertaken by Jette Baagøe, director of the Danish Museum of Hunting and Forestry in Hørsholm and chair of the steering group which has worked on the nomination since 2010. The museum is expected to be the site manager and principal coordinator of information and news about the Par Force heritage site. On the basis of the significant increase in visitors to Stevns Museum resulting from the inclusion of Stevns Klint as a UNESCO heritage site in 2014, Baagøe expects more visitors to the museums of North Zealand, especially to the Museum of Hunting and Forestry where a special exhibition will be devoted to the Par Force Hunting Landscape in October 2015.

== See also ==
- Danish Museum of Hunting and Forestry
- Kongernes Nordsjælland
