= Halldor Gunnløgsson House =

Building in Rudersdal Municipality, Denmark

- Interactive map of the Halldor Gunnløgsson House area

General information
- Location: Mikkelborg, Hærsholm Municipality, Rungsted Strandvej 68, 2970 Hørsholm, Denmark
- Coordinates: 55°52′32.66″N 12°32′57.91″E
- Completed: 1958

Design and construction
- Architect: Halldor Gunnløgsson

The Halldor Gunnløgsson House is the former home of Danish architect Halldor Gunnløgsson in Rungsted north of Copenhagen, Denmark. Completed to Gunnløgsson's own design in 1958 with inspiration from Japanese and American architecture, it is considered a central work in Danish architecture of the 1950s It was listed on the Danish register of protected buildings and places in 1983.

== History ==
The house was constructed in 1958 as the private home of architect Halldor Gunnløgsson and his wife Ida Lillemor Gunnløgsson. It was completed to Gunnløgsson's own design in 1059. Halldor Gunnløgsson lived in the house until his death in 1985. In 2006, Realdania By / Byg bought the house from his widow. She lived in the house as a tenant until March 2012.

== Architectrue ==
The house is constructed in glass and timber between two whitewashed brick gables. It stands on a podium of greenish-blue marble. The marble was leftover materials from Tårnby Town Hall.
