= Jægersborg Dyrehave =

Forest park in Denmark

Coordinates: 55°47′29″N 12°33′39″E

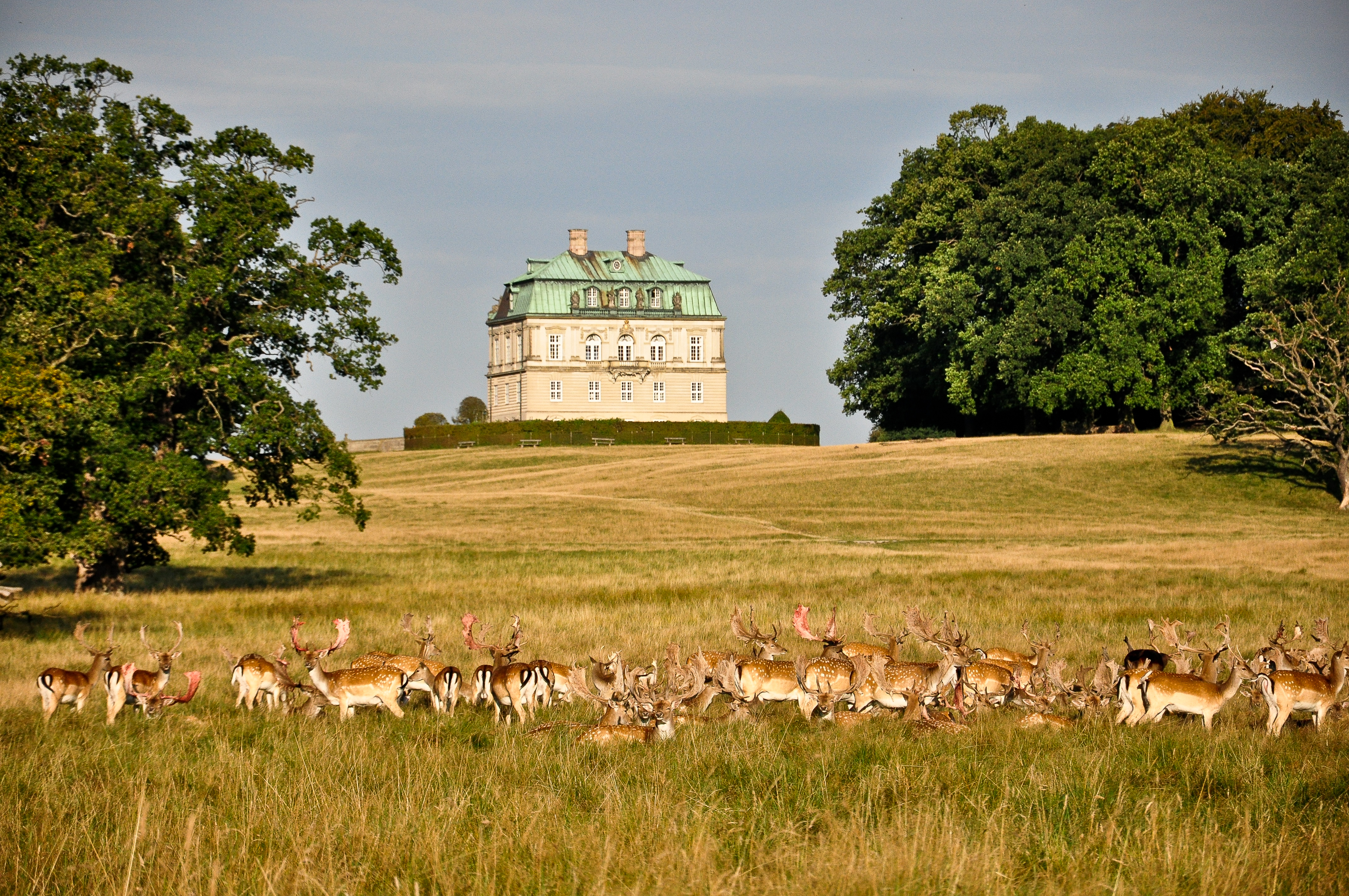
Fallow deer and the Hermitage

Dyrehaven (Danish, 'The Deer Park'), officially Jægersborg Dyrehave, is a forest park north of Copenhagen in the municipality of Lyngby-Taarbæk. To the north it borders Jægersborgs Hegn, which used to be part of the park until 1832. It covers around 11 km^{2} (4.2 sq mi). Dyrehaven is noted for its mixture of huge, ancient oak and beech trees and large populations of red and fallow deer. In July 2015, it was one of the three forests included in the UNESCO World Heritage Site inscribed as Par force hunting landscape in North Zealand (Nordsjælland).

All entrances to the park have a characteristic red gate with the insignia of the monarch painted on top; the most popular one is Klampenborg gate, opposite Klampenborg railway station. All the entrance gates have an identical gate house next to them, which today serve as the residences of the forest wardens. A total of 19 red gates and other entrances give access to the park. Dyrehaven is maintained as a natural forest, with the emphasis on the natural development of the woods over commercial forestry. Old trees are felled only if they are a danger to the public. It has herds of about 2100 deer in total, with 300 red deer, 1700 fallow deer and 100 sika deer. Dyrehaven is also the venue for the Hermitage road race (Eremitageløbet), held on the first Sunday of October and the Hubertus hunt (Hubertusjagten) which is held on the first Sunday in November. In former times it was home to the Fortunløbet race, later known as Ermelundsløbet, but this race was discontinued in 1960.

== History ==
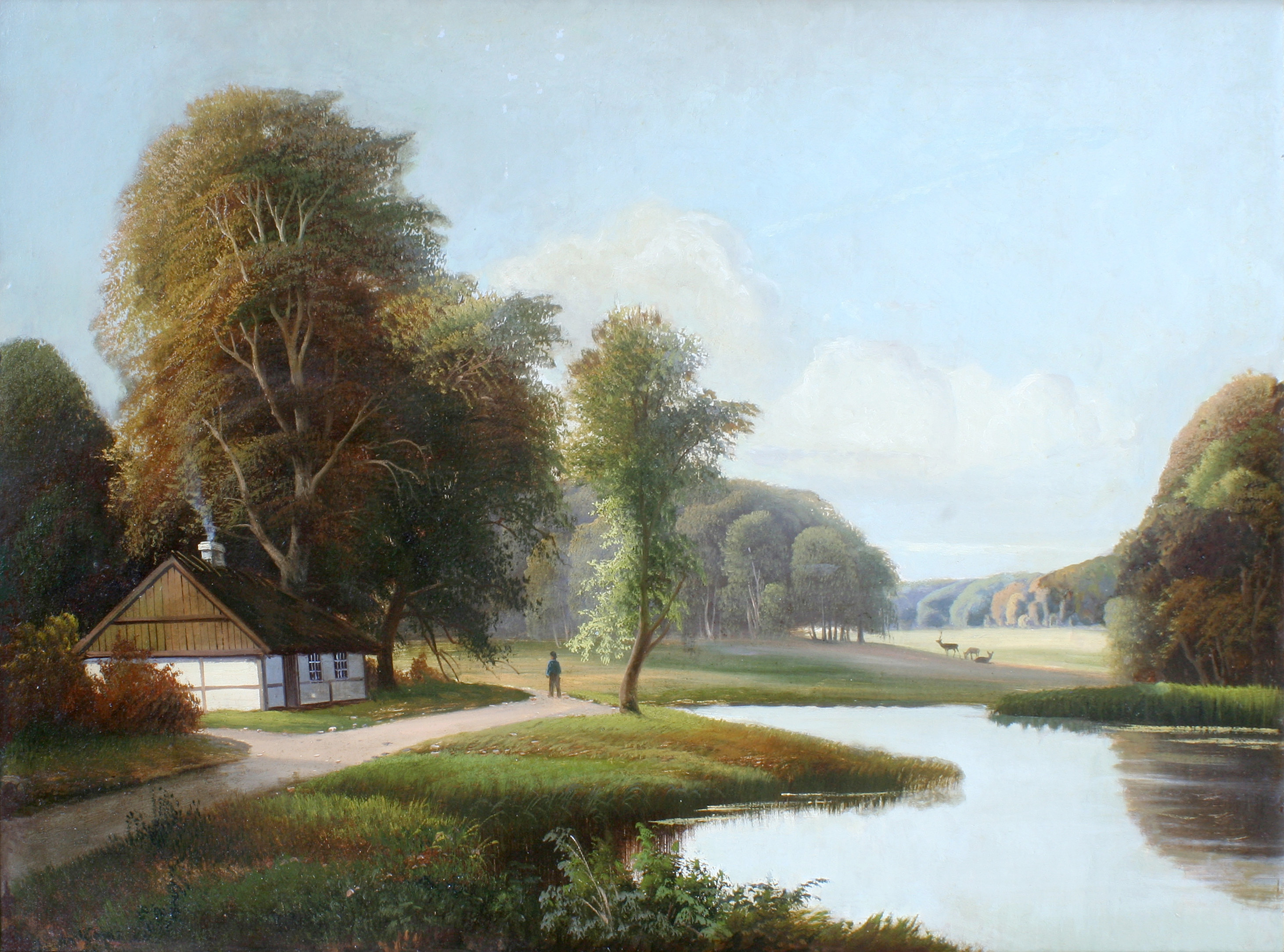
A 19th-century view of Dyrehaven by Sigfried Hass

In 1669 Frederik III decided that the wood of "Boveskov" ("Beech wood") should be fenced in and wild deer from the surrounding areas driven into the newly created park. Boveskov was already well known as the former property of Valdemar the Victorious as recorded in his census (the Liber Census Daniæ) of 1231. The forest lay in the westerly and southerly part of the present Dyrehaven and encompassed land used by the farmers from the village of Stokkerup, which lay to the north. Fencing work consisted of excavating a ditch, using the earth to build up a bank on the outside of the ditch. On the top of the earthen bank, posts were raised and fences of woven branches installed to bar the deer from escaping, utilizing the rise between the ditch and the bank with the fence as an obstacle. The ditch and bank can still be seen for a long stretch in the south-easterly part of the current park. The work was never finished, as Frederik III died in 1670. The design, however, is still on record, and the area for the scheme worked out at around 3 square kilometres. When Frederik's son, Christian V, became king, he laid out new and more ambitious plans for Dyrehaven.

During his education Christian V had spent time at the court of Louis XIV in France. Here he had seen a new type of hunting practice, parforce (hunting with dogs), that he wished to adopt. This style of hunting require bigger grounds, so Christian V increased the boundaries to include the fields up to the village of Stokkerup (the area known today as Eremitagesletten), as well as what is today Jægersborg Hegn. The additional enclosure increased the size of the park to 16 km^{2} (6.2 sq mi). The inhabitants of Stokkerup, whose village pond still lies within Eremitagesletten area, were ordered to tear down their houses and make use of the materials to rebuild the farms in the area that had stood empty since the Northern Wars. They were compensated for this by being exempt from taxation for a period of three years.

== Areas in Dyrehaven ==
=== Eremitagesletten ===
Eremitagesletten in August

Eremitagesletten is an area in the northern part of the park. Originally this area composed the fields of the village of Stokkerup, but was enclosed when Christian V wanted it for parforce hunting. Evidence of this can still be clearly seen from the roads which are laid out in the classic star form typical for this type of hunting. This enables spectators to the sport to view the hunting from the mid-point, the Hermitage castle, built during the reign of Christian VI.

Eremitagesletten is encircled by forest. From Hjortekær to the north and the east there is a row of chestnut trees that make up the boundaries of the plain. This row of trees marked the northern extent of Dyrehaven until 1913, when the boundaries were extended north of Mølleåen.

=== Mølleåen ===
This is an area north of Eremitagesletten near Rådvad along the banks of Mølleåen Millstream.

=== Fortunens Indelukke ===
Fortunens Indelukke is an area in the western part of Dyrehaven. It is fenced in and is the only part of the forest where the deer have no access, baring a few temporarily fenced-in areas serving to allow new trees to grow.

=== Ulvedalene ===
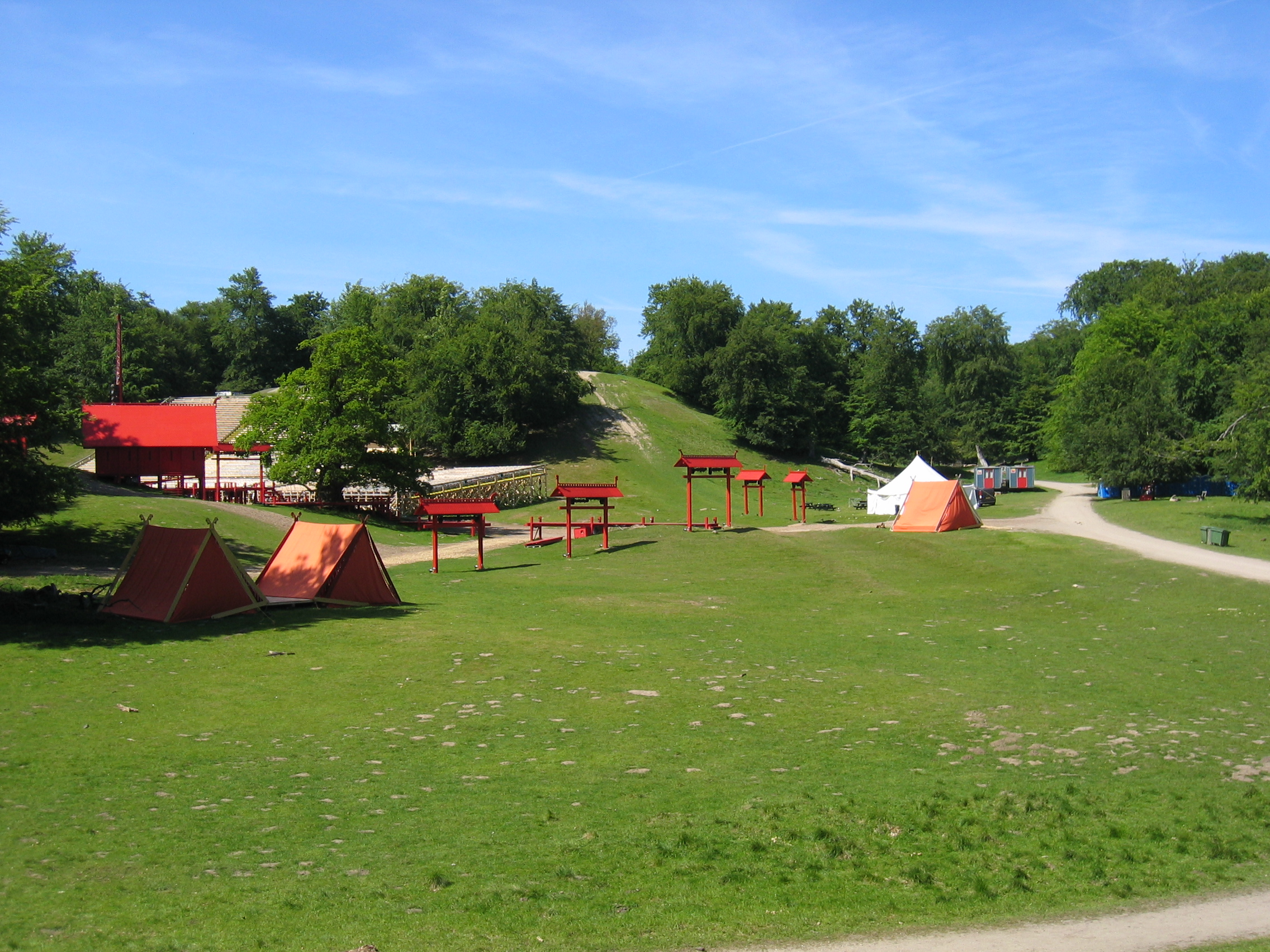
Ulvedalene with Djævlebakken in the background. The many tents and constructions are part of the theatre production.

Ulvedalene is Dyrehaven's hilliest area, formed during the last ice age. Djævlebakken, a popular sledging run is found in this part of the park. Ulvedalsteateret (Ulvedal theatre) staged performances for 39 years, starting in the summer of 1910 with Adam Gottlob Oehlenschläger's Hagbart and Signe. The idea to create a theater at this location was the brain-child of actor Adam Poulsen and producer Henrik Cavling. The architect Jens Ferdinand Willumsen created seats for about 4,000 viewers and 2,000 standing room, allowing for affordable tickets. The theatre survived up to 1949, and after a break of almost 50 years, the tradition was revived in 1996 by lead actress Birgitte Price with a production of Johan Ludvig Heiberg's Elverhøj, supported by the Royal Danish Theatre, Lyngby-Taarbæk Kommune and Kulturby'96. Since then there have been other productions, including Røde Orm in 2018. In 2020, a play based on J. R. R. Tolkien's The Hobbit was planned, but due to the COVID-19 pandemic, it was pushed to 2021. Performances are planned every two or three years.

=== Von Langens Plantage ===
This is the southernmost part of Dyrehaven and the most visited.

==== Dyrehavsbakken ====
Dyrehavsbakken (colloquially Bakken and literally in English "The Deer Park's Hill") is the world's oldest existing amusement park.

==== Kirsten Piils Kilde ====
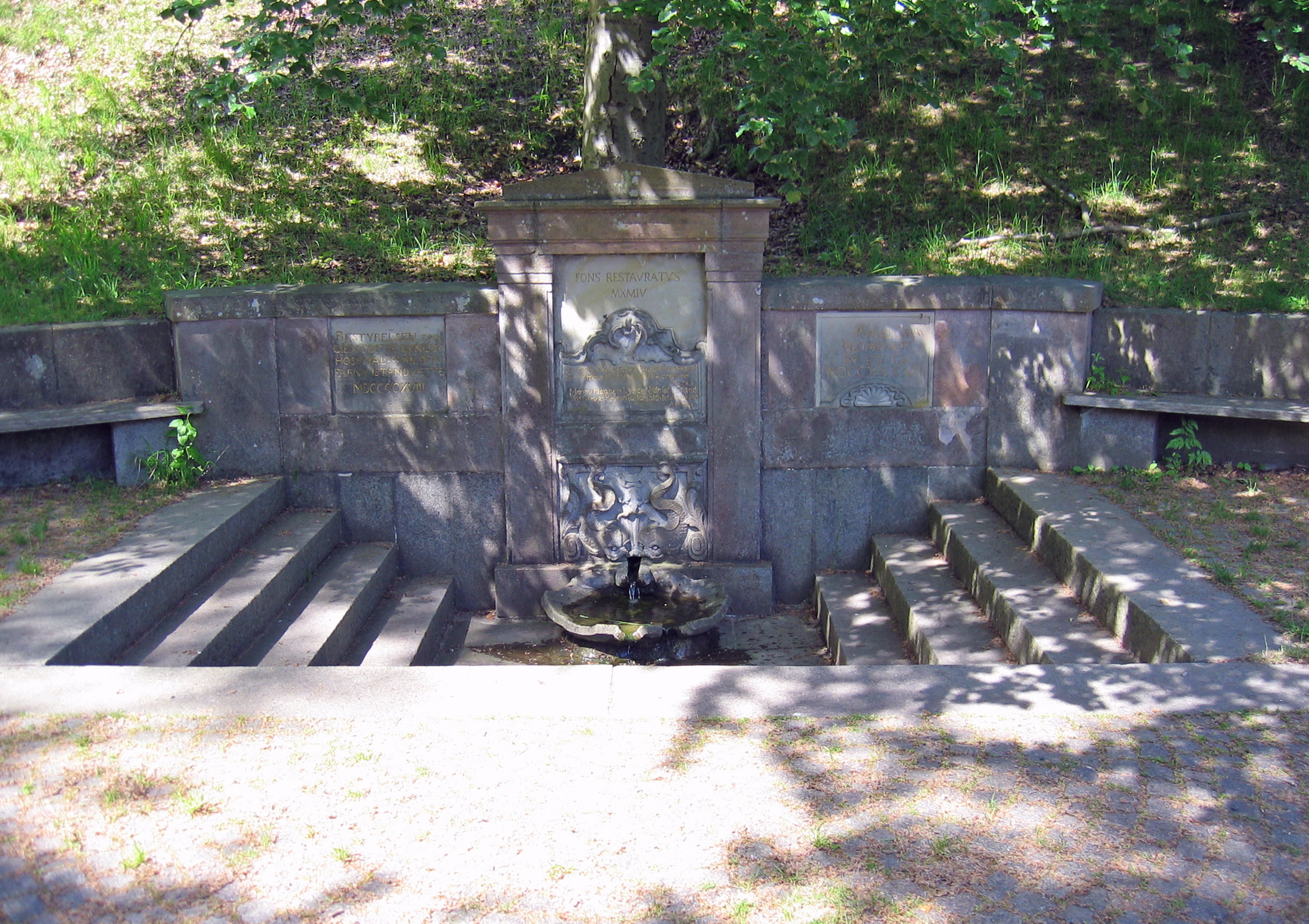
Kirsten Piil's Spring. The water is still potable.

Kirsten Piils Kilde (Kirsten Piil's Spring) was discovered in 1583 by Kirsten Piil about whom little is known. Tradition has it that Kirsten was a pious woman, who, through her devotion, gave the spring curative powers, which made it a place of pilgrimage for the sick who would come to drink the water.

==== Peter Lieps Hus ====
Peter Lieps Hus (Peter Liep's House) is now a well-known restaurant. It is named after Dyrehaven's first sharpshooter, Peter Liep. The house was originally called Kildehuset (The Spring House) and is thought to have been to be built towards the end of the 18th century. In the 1860s a two-storey extension was added that gave the house a clumsy appearance. Peter Liep took over the building in 1888. In September 1915 the house burned to the ground, but it was reconstructed the next year. In 1928 the house burned down again and was rebuilt to a different design, basically as it can be seen today. After some years a pavilion and toilets were added. Visitor numbers consistently rose (the house had already achieved a good reputation as a restaurant by the end of the 19th century). In 1952 a fire again broke out in the house. The fire was extinguished before it did any major damage: a hole was burned in the thatched roof, but later the same day the extensions caught fire and burned down. Only the main farmhouse was salvable. The extensions were rebuilt in 1954 and a new pavilion added in 1960. All these buildings are today known under the collective name "Peter Lieps Hus", though the house is very different from the house Peter Liep lived in on the same spot.

==== Fortunen ====
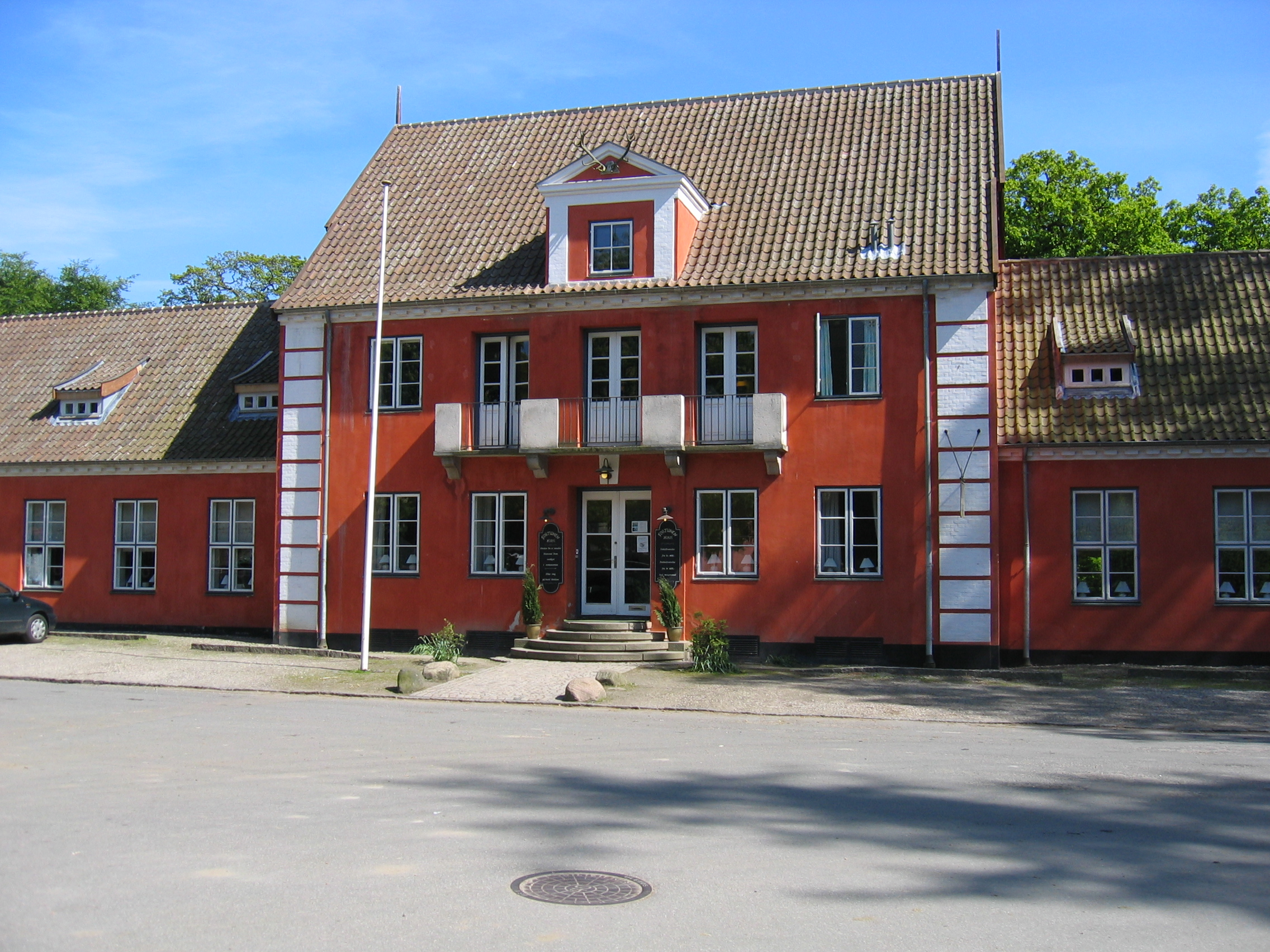
Fortunen restaurant

Fortunen (The Fortune) is a former ranger station on the King's hunting road to Dyrehaven, named after the Roman goddess of luck Fortuna. It is now home to a hotel and restaurant.

== Annual events ==
- Eremitage race
- Day of the Kite

=== Hubertus Hunt ===
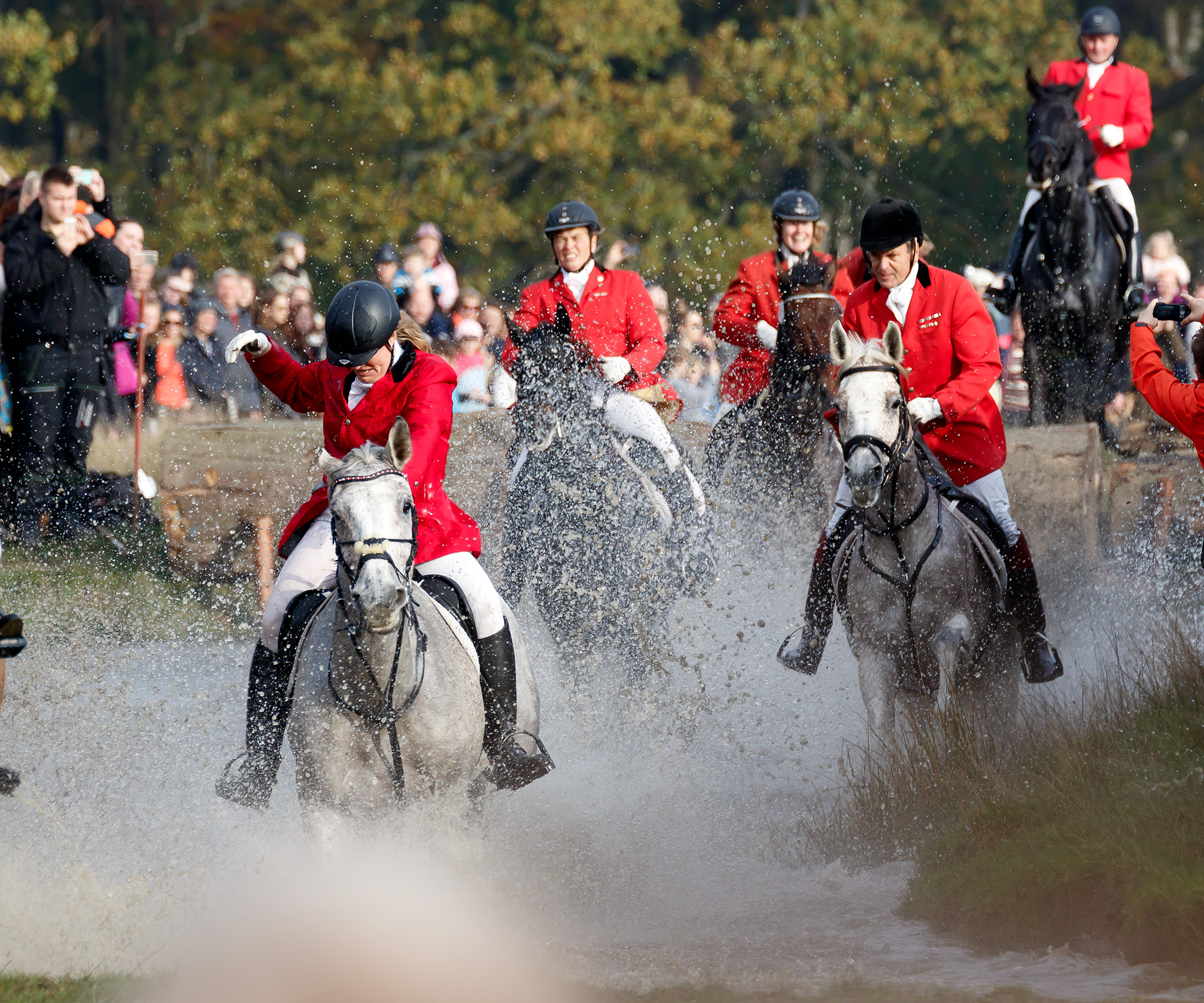
The Hubertus Hunt in 2014

The Hubertus Hunt is a cross country horse race which takes place every year on the first Sunday in November, marking the end of the hunting season. First held in 1900, the event attracts about 160 riders and up to 40,000 spectators. The race always begins at Peter Liep's House and involves a break at the Hermitage Lodge. The race route is 13 km long and involves a total of 35 obstacles. The winner receives the Hubertus chain.

=== Open air theatre ===
Beginning in 1910, the Royal Danish Theatre started what was intended to become an annual theatre production during the summer at Ulvedalene in Jægersborg Dyrehave. This continued with semi-regular productions until 1949. The tradition was revived in 1996 with a performance of Elverhøj and has continued since then with a production every two or three years, the latest being the play Ragnarok (2023) inspired by Nordic mythology and written by Kim Fupz Aakeson.
