= Hermitage Hunting Lodge =

Building in Denmark

Coordinates: 55°47′43″N 12°34′16″E

Hermitage Hunting Lodge Eremitageslottet
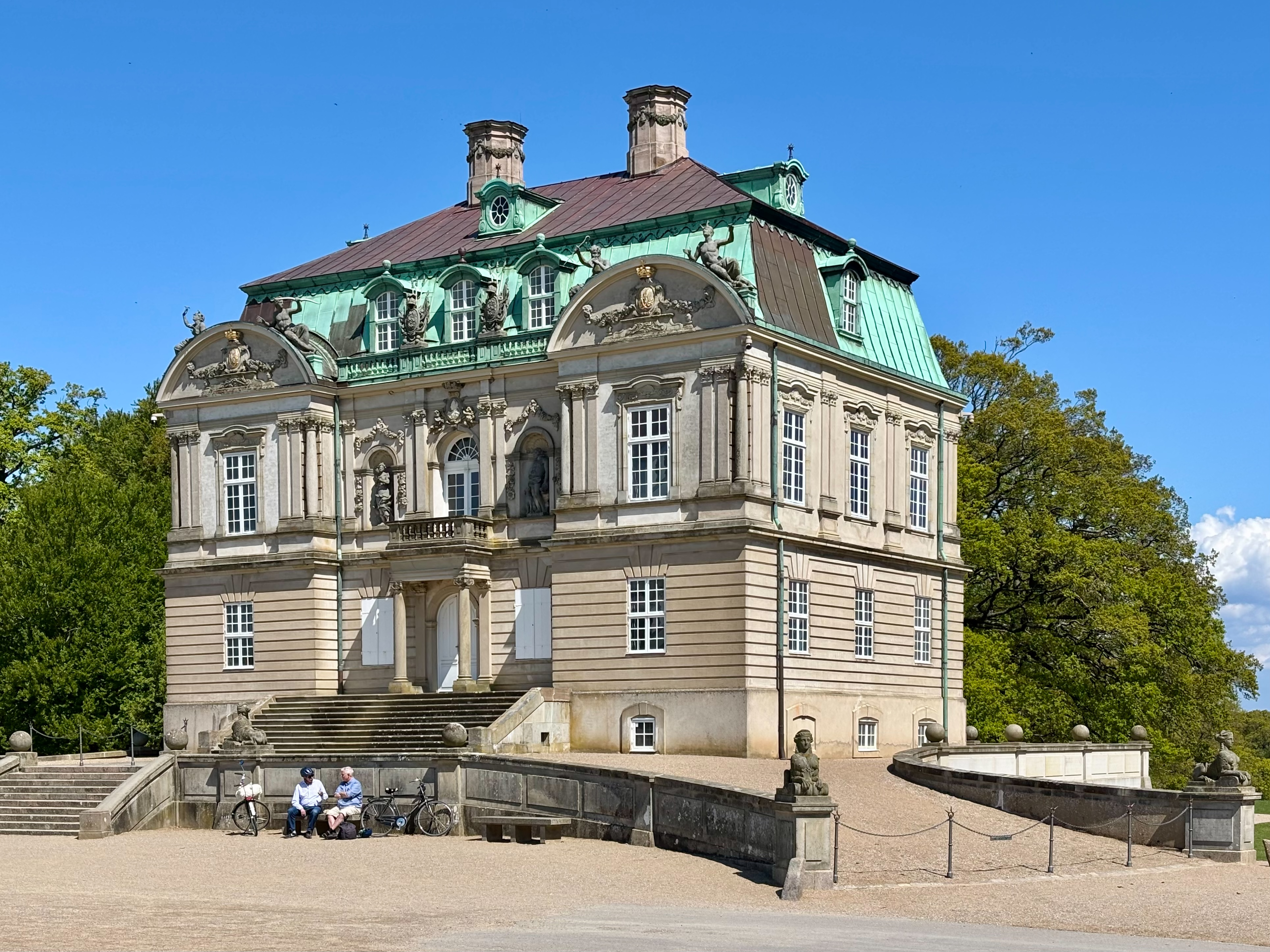

General information
- Architectural style: Baroque
- Location: Dyrehaven, Denmark
- Construction started: 1734
- Completed: 1736
- Cost: 18,000 rigsdaler
- Client: Christian VI

Design and construction
- Architect: Lauritz de Thurah

The Hermitage Hunting Lodge (Danish: Eremitageslottet or Eremitagen) is located in Dyrehaven north of Copenhagen, Denmark. The hunting lodge was built by architect Lauritz de Thurah in Baroque style from 1734 to 1736 for Christian VI of Denmark-Norway in order to host royal banquets during royal hunts in Dyrehaven.

== Name ==
Never intended for residence, the Hermitage Hunting Lodge was built as a setting for hosting royal banquets during hunts in Dyrehaven, which surrounds the building. It originally featured a hoisting apparatus able to hoist the table from the basement to the dining room, allowing the King and his guests to dine without any waiters present, or "en ermitage" (in solitude), hence the name of the castle. The apparatus was removed in the late 18th century as it was causing endless mechanical problems, and no signs of it remain. The previous castle on the site, the Hubertus chalet, had a similar apparatus and was nicknamed Heremitagen for the same reason.

== History ==
The area surrounding the building was fenced as Jægersborg Dyrehave on the initiative of Frederick III, beginning in 1699. The project was not completed in his lifetime, and Christian V, who was influenced by the time he had spent at the court of Louis XIV in France, changed the plans for the fencing to include a much larger area in order to facilitate a new style of driven hunt. This style of hunting involved having hounds run the prey tired and hold it down until a hunter would step off his horse and make the kill at little effort. In order for the hunters to be able to keep track of the hounds, a landscape with straight paths laid out to meet in star-shaped intersections, from which the hunters would be able to see the prey and the hounds whenever they crossed one of the paths, was required.

The fencing of the larger area resulted in a compulsory relocation of the residents, and among other things the village of Stokkerup was demolished, and today only the village pond remains, south of the hunting lodge.

The first hunting lodge on the site, the Hubertus chalet (Danish: Hubertushuset), was built by Hans van Steenwinckel III for Christian V, and was completed around 1694. It was a half-timbered house in two storeys, but the structure was most likely far too weak, and in spite of extensive repairs in 1731, the chalet was in such a poor condition in 1734 that it was deemed necessary to tear it down and Lauritz de Thurah was hired to build a new hunting lodge on the site. It was built during 1734 to 1736 during the reign of Christian VI at a total cost of about 18,000 rigsdaler.

A planned renovation in 1786 was cancelled, as the estimated cost of 3,000 rigsdaler was considered too expensive. In 1790 the decision to tear the building down was made, but the decision was not very popular. Count Rantzau launched a defence of the building and asked the king for permission to acquire it as his private property in exchange for the Rantzau residence in Jægersborg and for giving the king access to it. In 1794, the project succeeded, and Rantzau began a renovation of the building at a cost of 4,000 rigsdaler. It did not take long for Rantzau to find its location inconvenient and remote. He decided to sell and by 1797 the hunting lodge was once again royal property.

In 1798, the architect Johan Boye Junge Magens initiated yet another round of repairs, and in the process many of the exterior sculptures and decorations were removed. Magens was, as fashion dictated, eager to rid the building of the decorations that made it typical of its time.

In the early 19th century, after the Treaty of Kiel, Frederick VI changed the use of Dyrehaven; the area was mainly used for military exercises. The lodge was still in use, but mainly for lunches for the king and officers. When Christian VIII became king in 1839, the hunts resumed. Additionally, the Hermitage became the centre of large, public gatherings, and in this period it was often the site of political negotiations. On 5 June 1849, king Frederik VII signed the fresh Danish constitution at the Hermitage at 11.15, ending absolute monarchy in Denmark. Five years later, on 5 June 1854 it was the center of the first, large celebration of the Constitution of Denmark during which 30,000 people assembled before it.

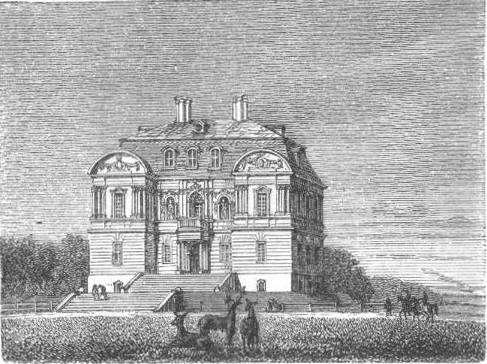
The Hermitage during the 1890s

During the 1890s, architect Ferdinand Meldahl supervised a thorough renovation taking great care to restore its original exterior decorations. The interior decorations, which had been painted over, were cleaned up and renovated with an almost religious attention to the original detail.

Today the castle is run by the Agency for Palaces & Cultural Properties, an agency of the Ministry of Culture and is made available to the royal family. In June 2013, it was re-opened by Margrethe II after an extensive refurbishment.

== Gallery ==
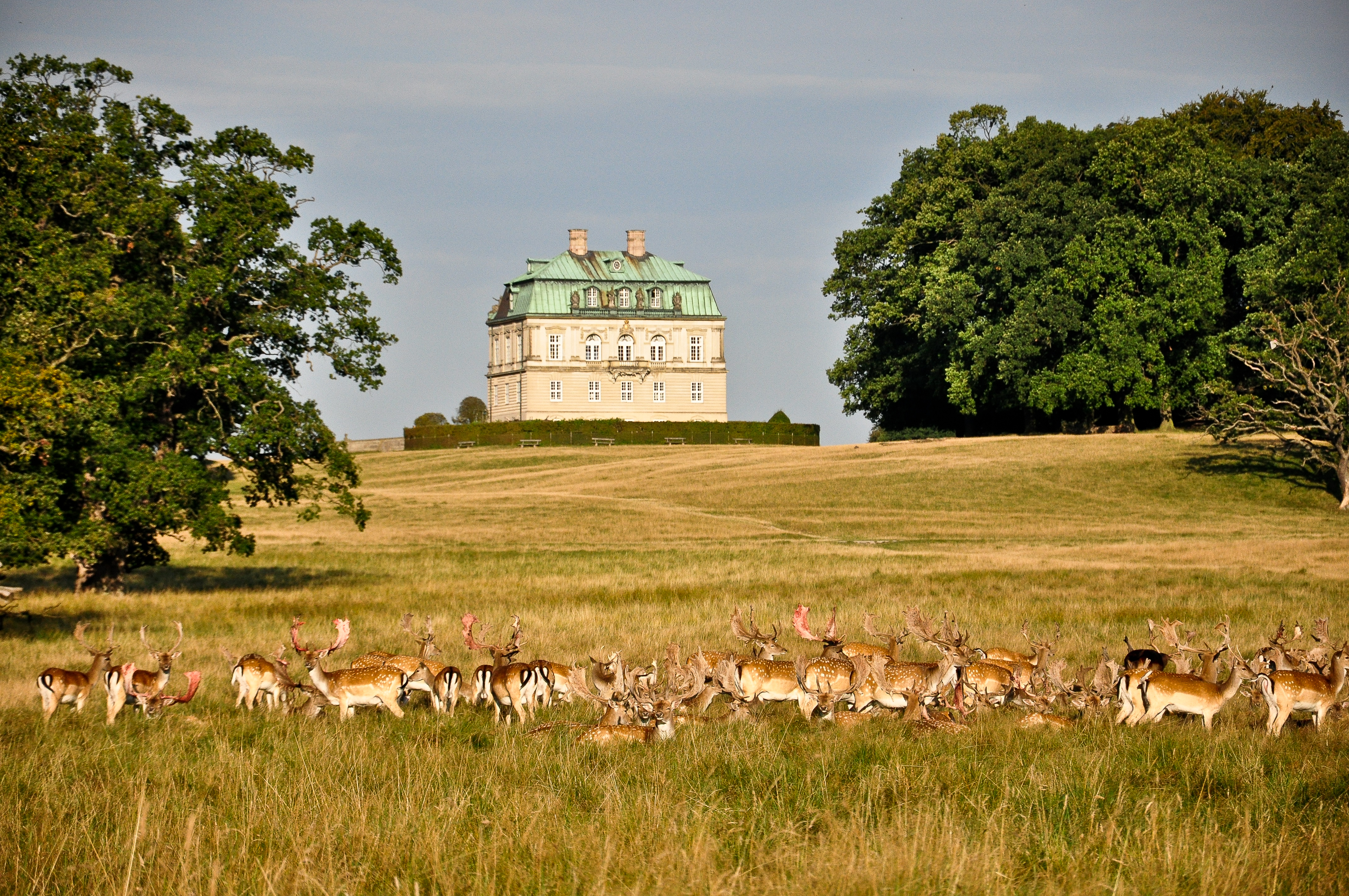
Fallow deer and the Hermitage

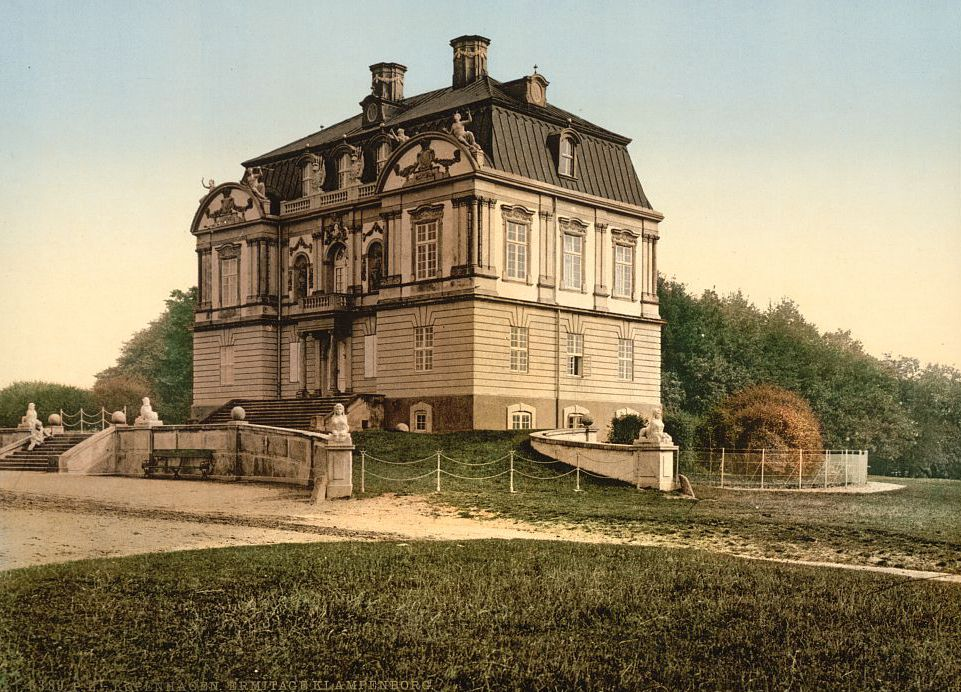
The Hermitage seen from the east
Photochrom prints--Color--1890-1900.

The Hermitage seen from the east

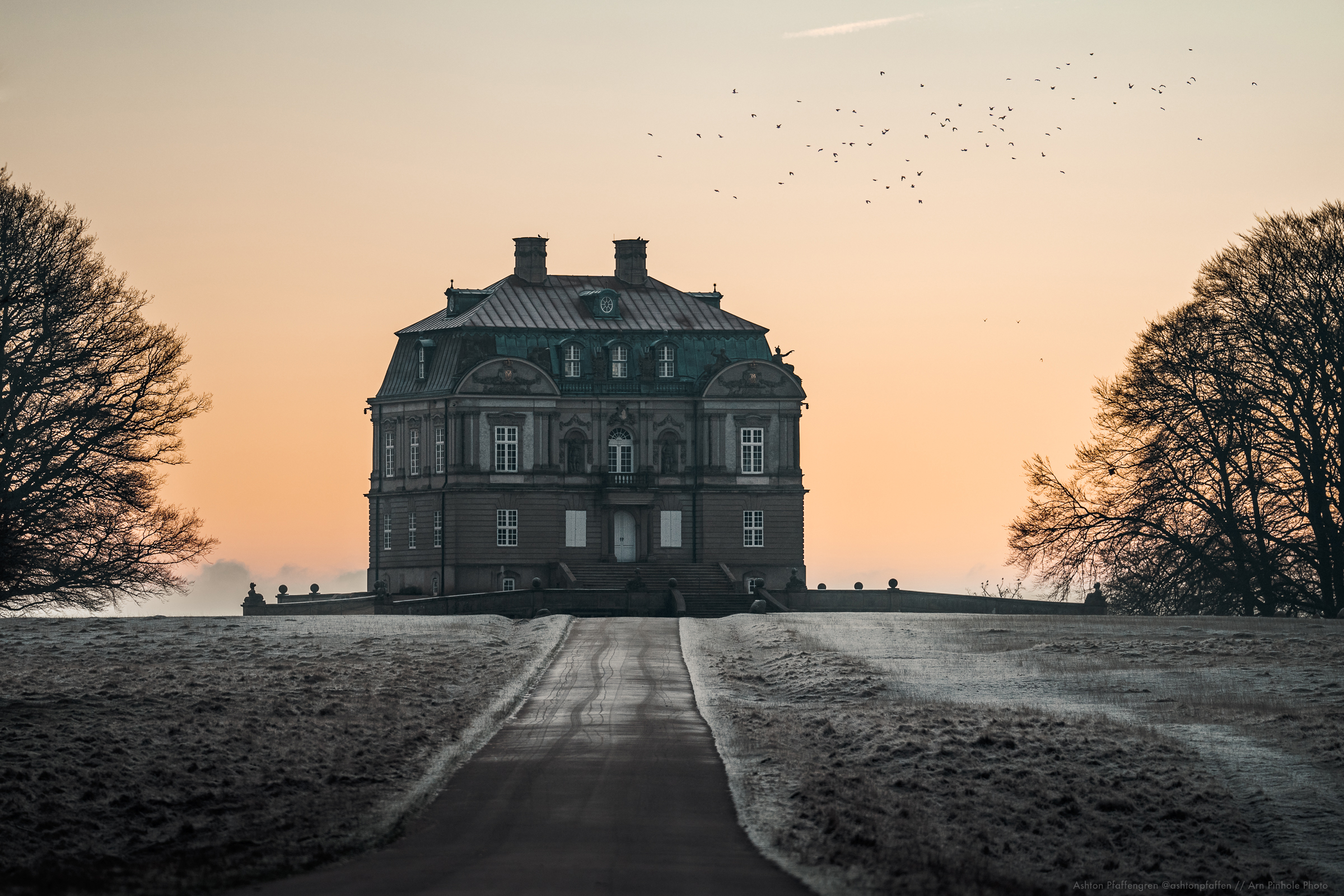
The Hermitage Lodge seen from the west at sunrise in January

== See also ==
- List of Baroque residences
