= Danish Museum of Hunting and Forestry =

Former forestry museum in Hørsholm, Denmark

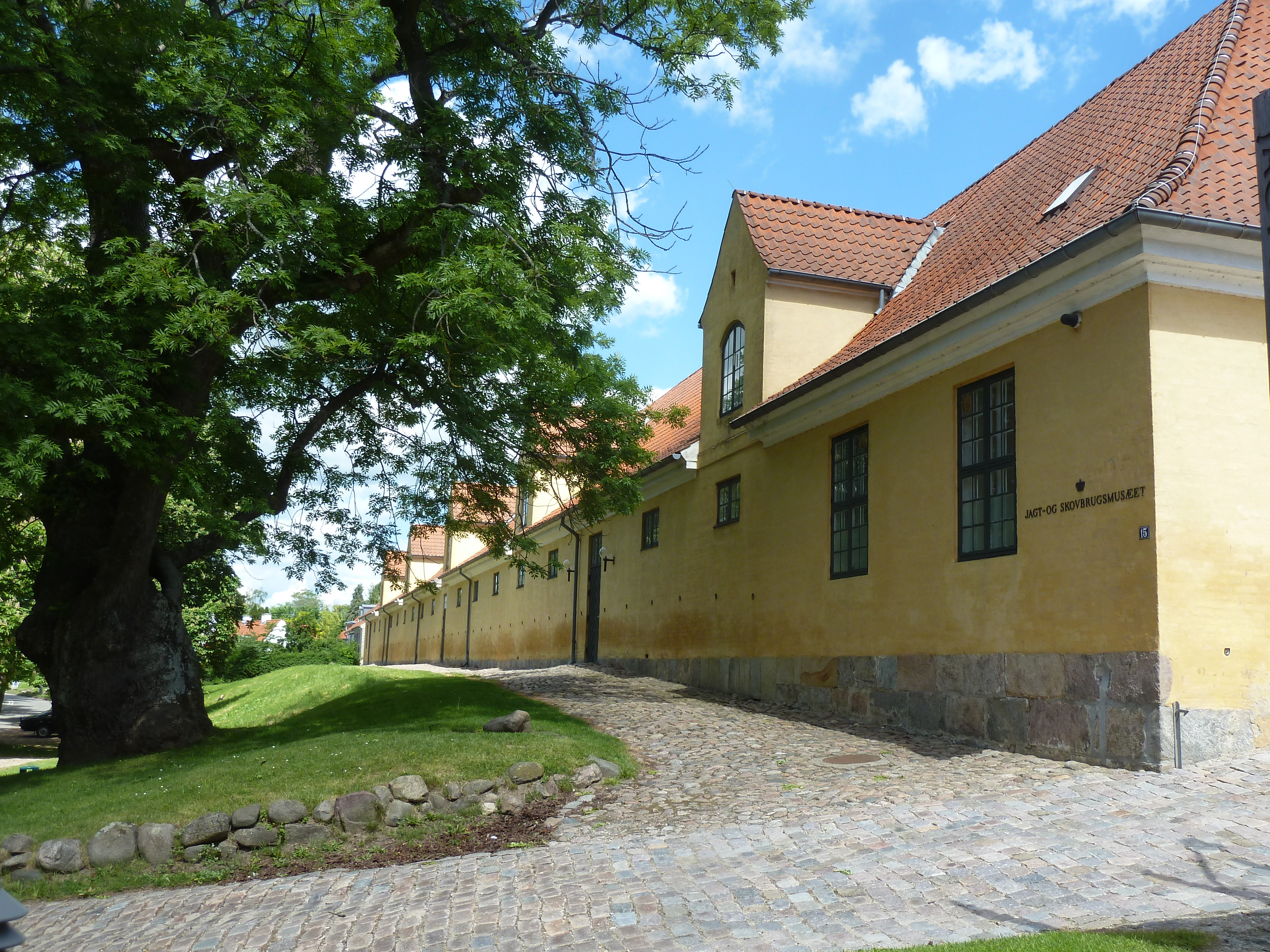
- Part of the buildings
- Established: 1907
- Location: Hørsholm, Denmark
- Coordinates: 55.8757°N 12.5023°E
- Director: Jette Baagøe
- Website: Official website

The Danish Museum of Hunting and Forestry (Danish: Dansk Jagt- og Skovbrugsmuseum) was a state-owned museum in Hørsholm exhibiting objects connected with the history of hunting and forestry in Denmark. It is now closely associated with the UNESCO-listed Par force hunting landscape in North Zealand.

In 2017, the museum was combined with the Danish Agricultural Museum and is now known as the Green Museum. It is located in Auning in northern Jutland.

== History ==
The museum was established in 1942. It is based in the former farm buildings of Hirschholm Palace.

== UNESCO Par Force Hunting Landscape ==
The Par force hunting landscape in North Zealand was inscribed on the list of UNESCO World Heritage Sites on 4 July 2015. Much of the preparatory work on the nomination was undertaken by Jette Baagøe, director of the Museum of Hunting and Forestry and chair of the steering group which began work on the nomination in 2010. The museum is expected to be the site manager and principal coordinator of information and news about the Par Force heritage site. On the basis of the significant increase in visitors to Stevns Museum resulting from the inclusion of Stevns Klint as a UNESCO heritage site in 2014, Baagøe expects more visitors to the museums of North Zealand, especially to the Hunting and Forestry Museum which held an exhibition devoted to the Par Force Hunting Landscape in October of 2015.

== Exhibitions ==
The exhibitions consist of three collections:

- The Hunting collection illustrate the history of hunting in Denmark from ancient times until the present day.
- The forestry collections focus on tools and used in forestry before c. 1850.
- An exhibition about modern forestry with machines used in recent times and equipment used by workers in the industry. Children can try it on and enter the machines.

== See also ==
- Hørsholm Local History Museum
