= Hirschholm Palace =

Building in Hørsholm, Denmark

Coordinates: 55°52′29″N 12°30′1″E

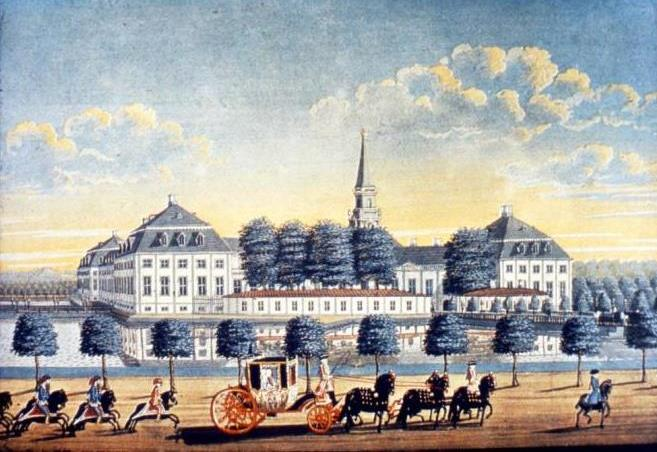
- Interactive map of the Hirschholm Palace area

General information
- Architectural style: Baroque
- Location: Hørsholm, Denmark
- Construction started: 1733
- Completed: 1744
- Demolished: 1809-13
- Client: Sophia Magdalena of Denmark

Design and construction
- Architect: Lauritz de Thurah

Hirschholm Palace, also known as Hørsholm Palace, was a royal palace located in present-day Hørsholm municipality just north of Copenhagen, Denmark. It was rebuilt in the Baroque style in the 1740s and, one of the finest buildings of its time, it became known as the "Versailles of the North".

It developed a notorious reputation in connection with its role in the affair between Johann Friedrich Struensee and Queen Caroline Mathilda in the 1770s. After that it fell into disrepair and was demolished in 1809–1813.

The palace was designed by Lauritz de Thurah for King Christian VI and his consort Queen Sophie Magdalene, and was intended as their summer residence.

== History ==
=== Early history ===
Hirschholm Palace was built on a site that had been used since the Middle Ages. From around 1100 there was a fortification at site known as Hørningsholm. In 1391 the estate became crown land when Queen Margrete I took possession of the property. At the end of the 16th century, Frederik II and Christian IV built a royal hunting lodge on the site. The estate, which covered a large area (the present-day municipalities of Hørsholm, Karlebo, Birkerød and a part of Allerød) was called the Noble Estate of Hørsholm (adelsgodset Hørsholm), and was endowed to various noblemen and members of the royal court.

By the middle of the 17th century, a royal tradition had developed whereby the ruling king bestowed Hørsholm Palace to his consort, and it was used as a summer residence. The estate was now being managed directly by the royal house, and income went to the Queen.

Frederick IV’s consort Queen Louise owned Hørsholm Palace between 1700 and 1721. She had it modernised and added a number of farm buildings to the estate.

=== The Baroque palace ===
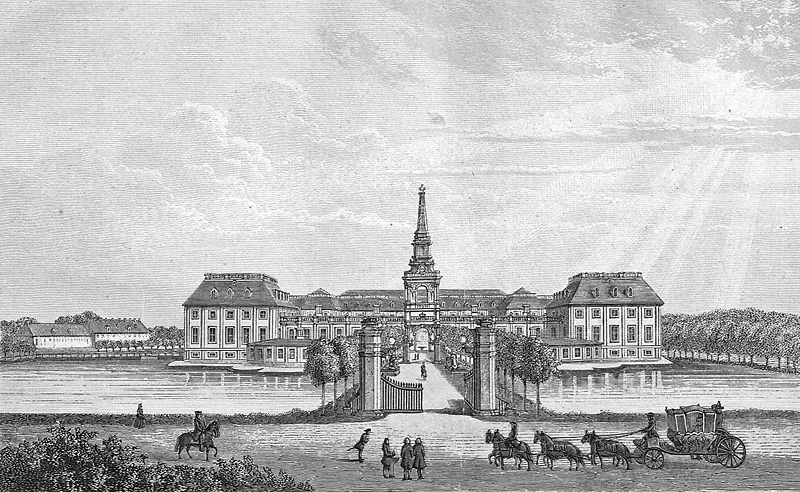
Hirschholm Palace

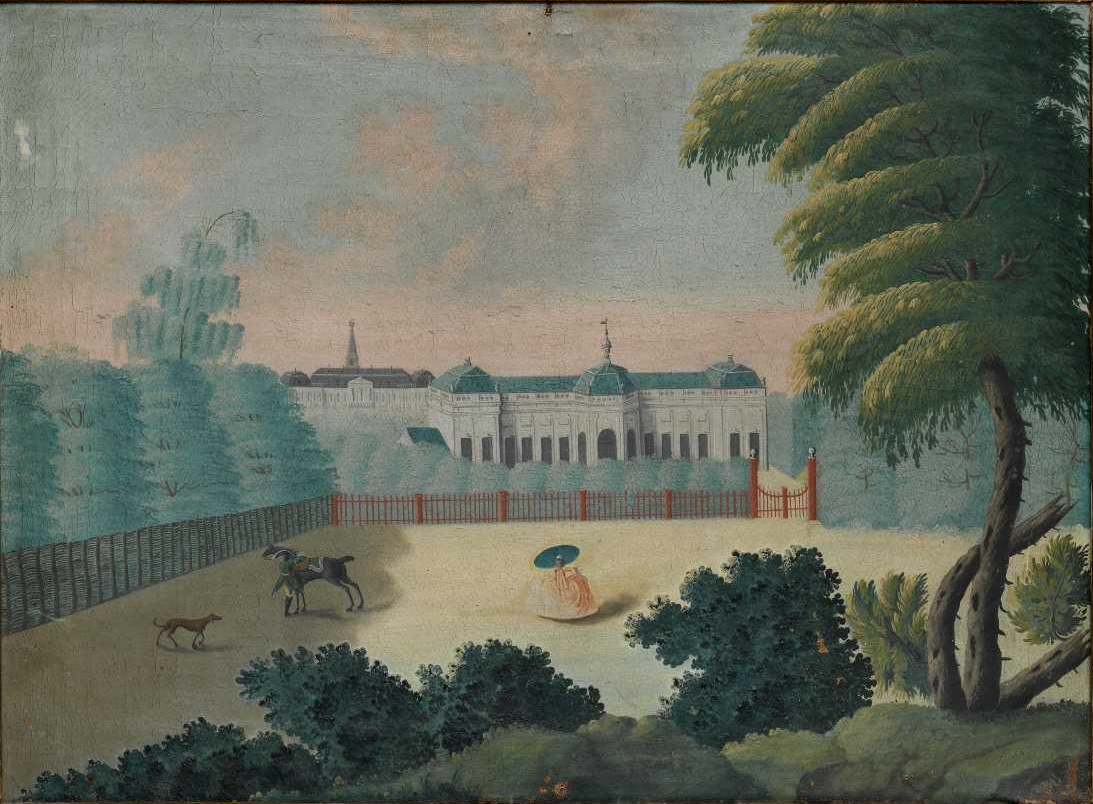
The royal orangery and shooting house at Hirschholm Palace in 1748.

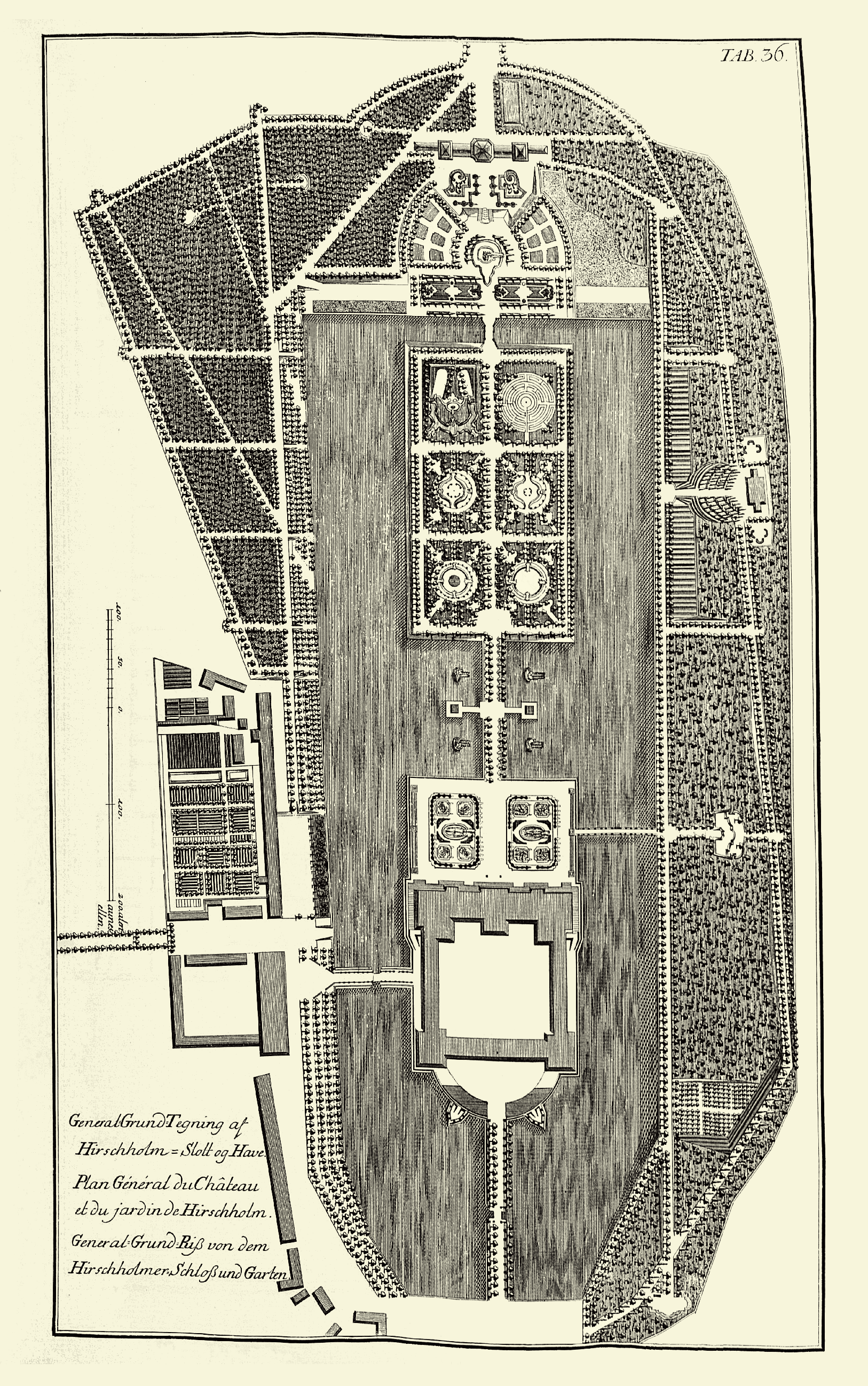
Plan of Hirschholm Palace (1749) by Lauritz de Thurah from Den Danske Vitruvius

Immediately after he became king in 1730, King Christian VI donated Hirschholm to his queen consort, Sophie Magdalene, as a life estate. Thus began a new phase in the history of the site. The queen decided that the old castle should be converted into a decent summer residence for the king and queen. Until the takeover, conditions at the place had been modest, in fact it was a medieval facility where only a few modernizations had been made. The de Thurah-designed baroque palace was completed in 1744 and was one of the most impressive building works of that period. It was referred to as "The Versailles of the North". When the king died in 1746 it became Sophie Magdalene's residence as Queen Dowager. She carried out a number of changes on the estate that pointed towards the agricultural reforms that would come to play a big role in the country during the coming decades.

Thurah's drawings of the palace were published in Den Danske Vitruvius in 1746–1749.

The Dowager Queen Sophie Magdalene died in 1770, and the palace was taken over by King Christian VII who used it as a summer residence for his family and court. On 17 June 1771 the royal family and court took summer residence at the palace, and on 7 July Queen Caroline Mathilde gave birth to her second child, Princess Louise Augusta, whose father was almost certainly Johann Friedrich Struensee. That summer has come to be referred to as the "Hirschholm Summer" in Danish history.

=== Neglect and demolition ===
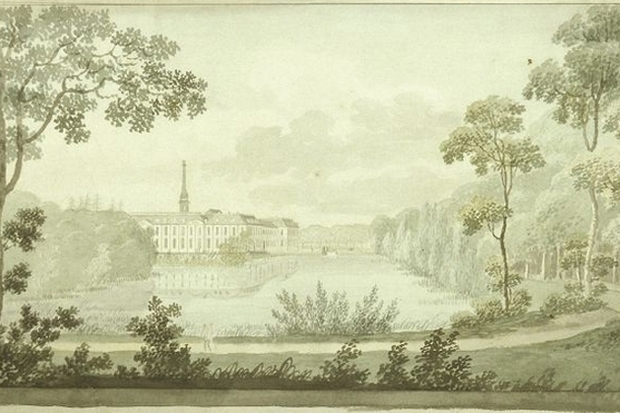
Hirschholm in decay, 1797

After that summer, and after the arrest of Struensee and the Queen on 17 January 1772, and the subsequent execution of Struensee, and the banishment and imprisonment of the Queen, the palace stood empty until 1810. At that time Frederik VI had the now dilapidated palace torn down for use as build materials for the rebuilding of Christiansborg Palace, which had burned to the ground in the fire of 1794.

== The site today ==
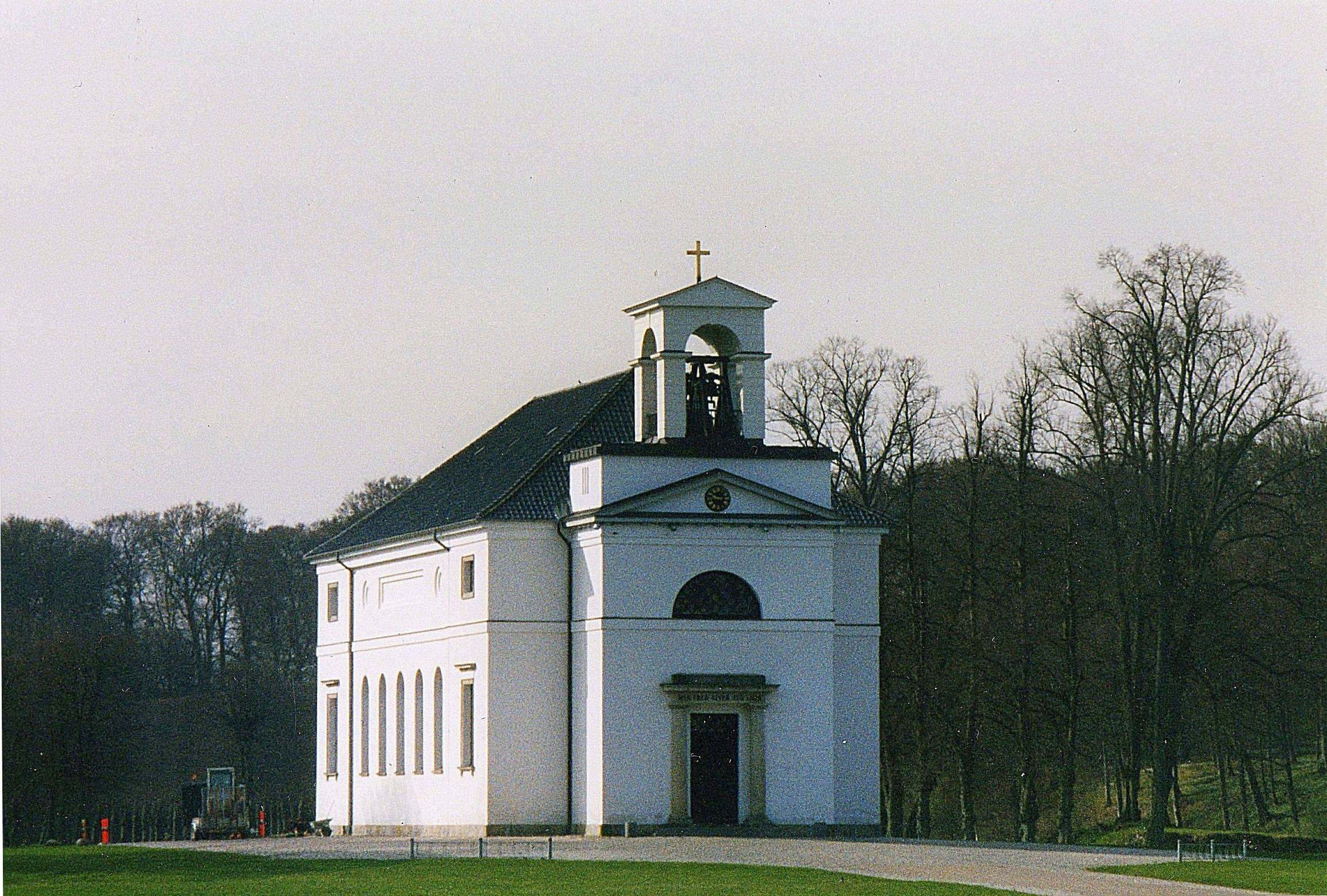
Hørsholm Church from 1883, now standing at the site of the former palace

In 1822-23 a small church designed by architect Christian Frederik Hansen was built on the grounds of the demolished palace. The park surrounding the church, which is located on a small island in a lake, still bears some evidence of the original palace garden. A number of the farm buildings Queen Louise had built in the early 18th century still exist. Some of them formerly housed the Danish Museum of Hunting and Forestry.

The Hørsholm Local History Museum has a permanent exhibit about the palace, the royal affair and its consequences.

== See also ==
- List of castles and palaces in Denmark
- List of Baroque residences
