= Christian VI =

King of Denmark and Norway from 1730 to 1746

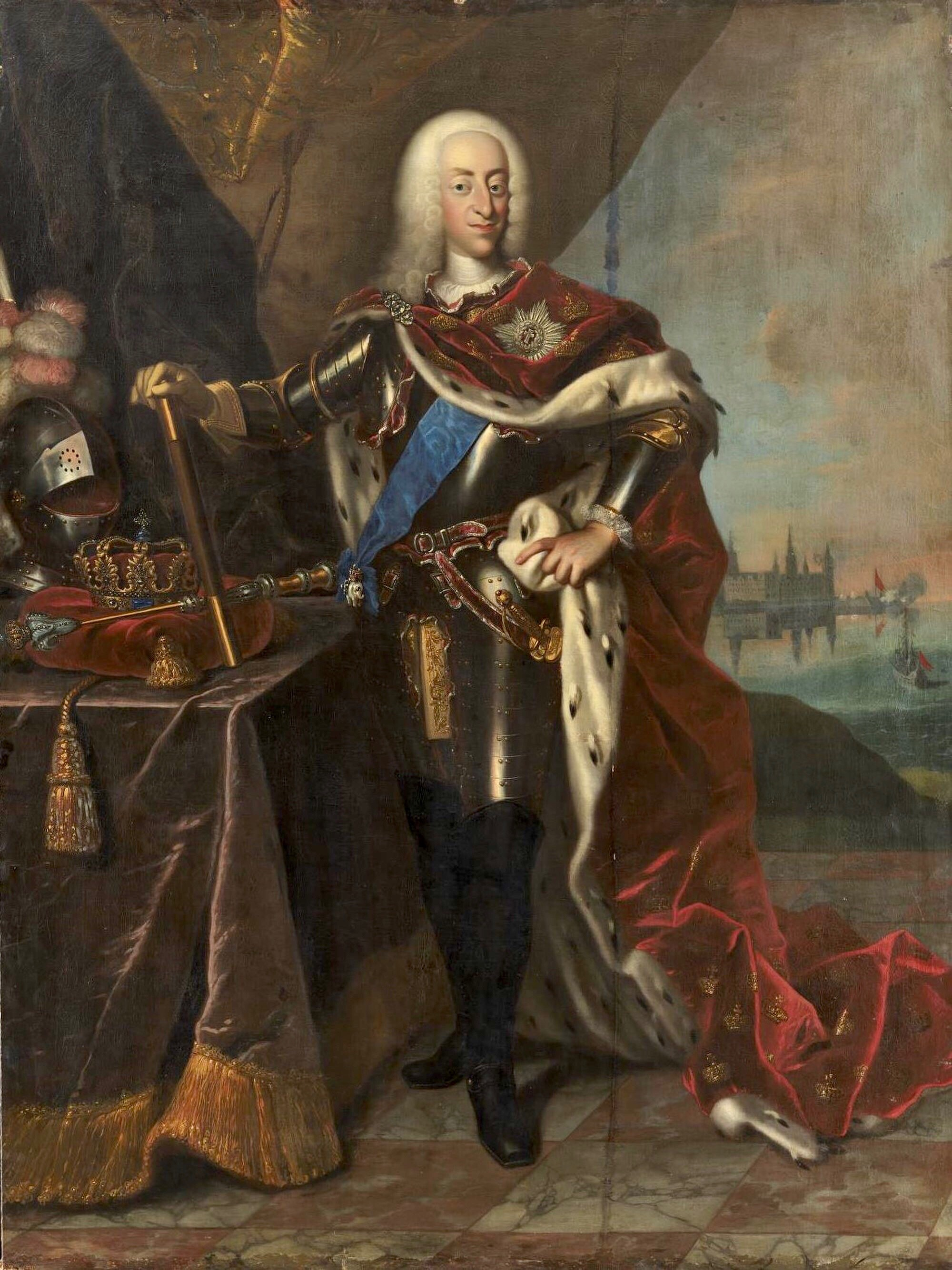
- Portrait by Johann Salomon Wahl

King of Denmark and Norway
- Reign: 12 October 1730 – 6 August 1746
- Coronation: 6 June 1731; Frederiksborg Palace Chapel
- Predecessor: Frederick IV
- Successor: Frederick V
- Chief Ministers: See list: Iver Rosenkrantz Johan Ludvig Holstein
- Born: 30 November 1699; Copenhagen Castle, Copenhagen, Denmark
- Died: 6 August 1746 (aged 46); Hirschholm Palace, Copenhagen, Denmark
- Burial: Roskilde Cathedral, Zealand
- Spouse: Sophie Magdalene of Brandenburg-Kulmbach (m. 1721)
- Issue: Frederik V Louise, Duchess of Saxe-Hildburghausen
- House: Oldenburg
- Father: Frederick IV of Denmark
- Mother: Louise of Mecklenburg-Güstrow
- Religion: Pietist

Christian VI (30 November 1699 – 6 August 1746) was King of Denmark and Norway from 1730 to 1746. The eldest surviving son of Frederick IV and Louise of Mecklenburg-Güstrow, he is considered one of Denmark–Norway's more anonymous kings, but he was a skilled politician, best known for his authoritarian regime. He was the first king of the Oldenburg dynasty to refrain from entering in any war. During his reign both compulsory confirmation (1736) and a public, nationwide school system (1739) were introduced. His chosen motto was "Deo et populo" (for God and the people).

== Early years ==
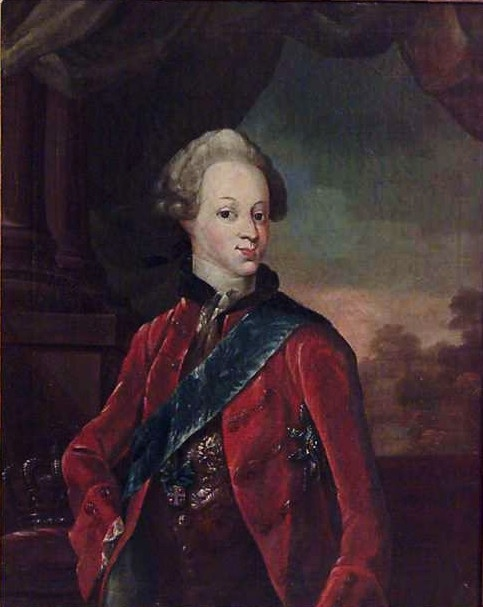
Christian as a child.

Christian was born in the early hours of the morning on 30 November 1699 at Copenhagen Castle as the second but eldest surviving son of King Frederick IV of Denmark by his first consort, Louise of Mecklenburg-Güstrow. A former heir to the throne, also named Christian, had died in infancy in 1698, and as his grandfather King Christian V had died just three months, before he was born, he was thus crown prince from birth. The newborn prince was baptized later the same day by the royal confessor Peder Jespersen, and was named after his late grandfather, King Christian V.

From 1706, Christian came to understand Danish but used German for everyday speaking and writing. He received a better education than both his father and grandfather.

As Crown Prince, he was allowed by his father to find a royal wife by himself. During a trip through Europe accompanied by Chancellor Ulrik Adolf Holstein, the Crown Prince decided on Sophie Magdalene of Brandenburg-Kulmbach, one of the ladies-in-waiting at the court of the Saxon-Polish queen Christiane Eberhardine in the Castle Pretzsch. Sophia Magdalene came from a minor margraviate (not greater than Lolland-Falster) of the Hohenzollern dynasty where able consciousness was inversely proportional to the funds; half of the land was mortgaged, and her father died young. She had 13 siblings and was considered an unequal match for the Danish prince, but the king gave his permission. In Christian's letters, he describes his feelings for the princess's intense religiosity, which reminded him of his own. They were married on 7 August 1721, while Christian was crown prince. The wedding was held at Pretzsch in Saxony.

== Reign ==
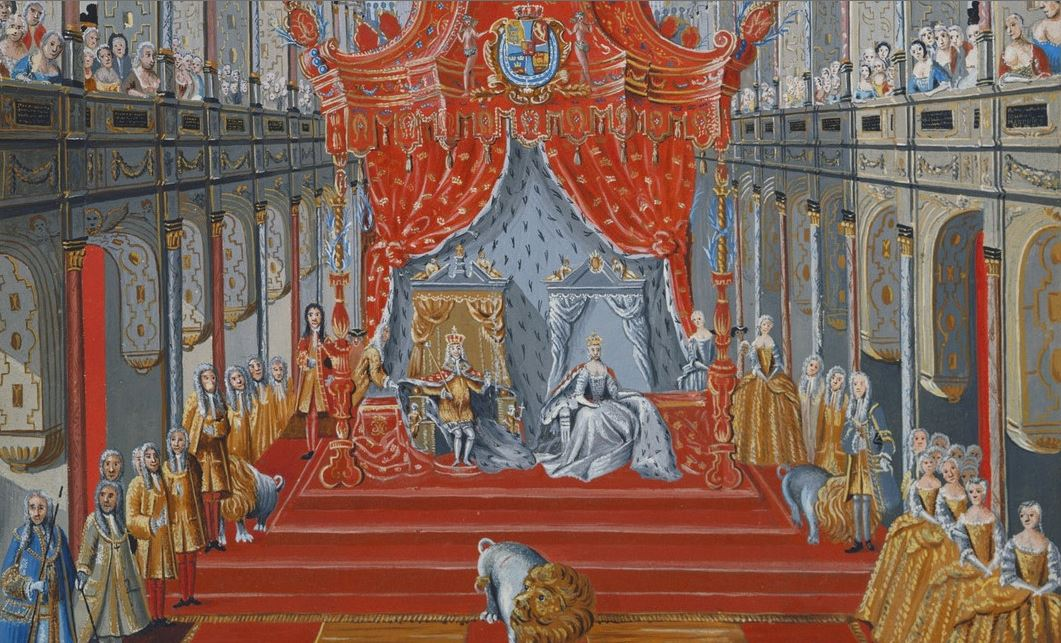
The Coronation of Christian VI, 1731.

At the death of Frederick IV on 12 October 1730, the couple became King and Queen of Denmark–Norway. They were crowned on 6 June 1731 in the Chapel of Frederiksborg Palace.

The king was shy and introverted by nature, and stayed away from the public. Christian's indignation at his father's bigamy and general promiscuity – the reason for the great sorrow of his late mother – led him to one of his first government actions: reversing his father's will and depriving widow Queen Anna Sophie, (Frederick IV's third wife if all "marriages" are counted, second wife if bigamous marriages excluded), of a large part of the wealth she had inherited before exiling her to the Clausholm estate, her childhood home.

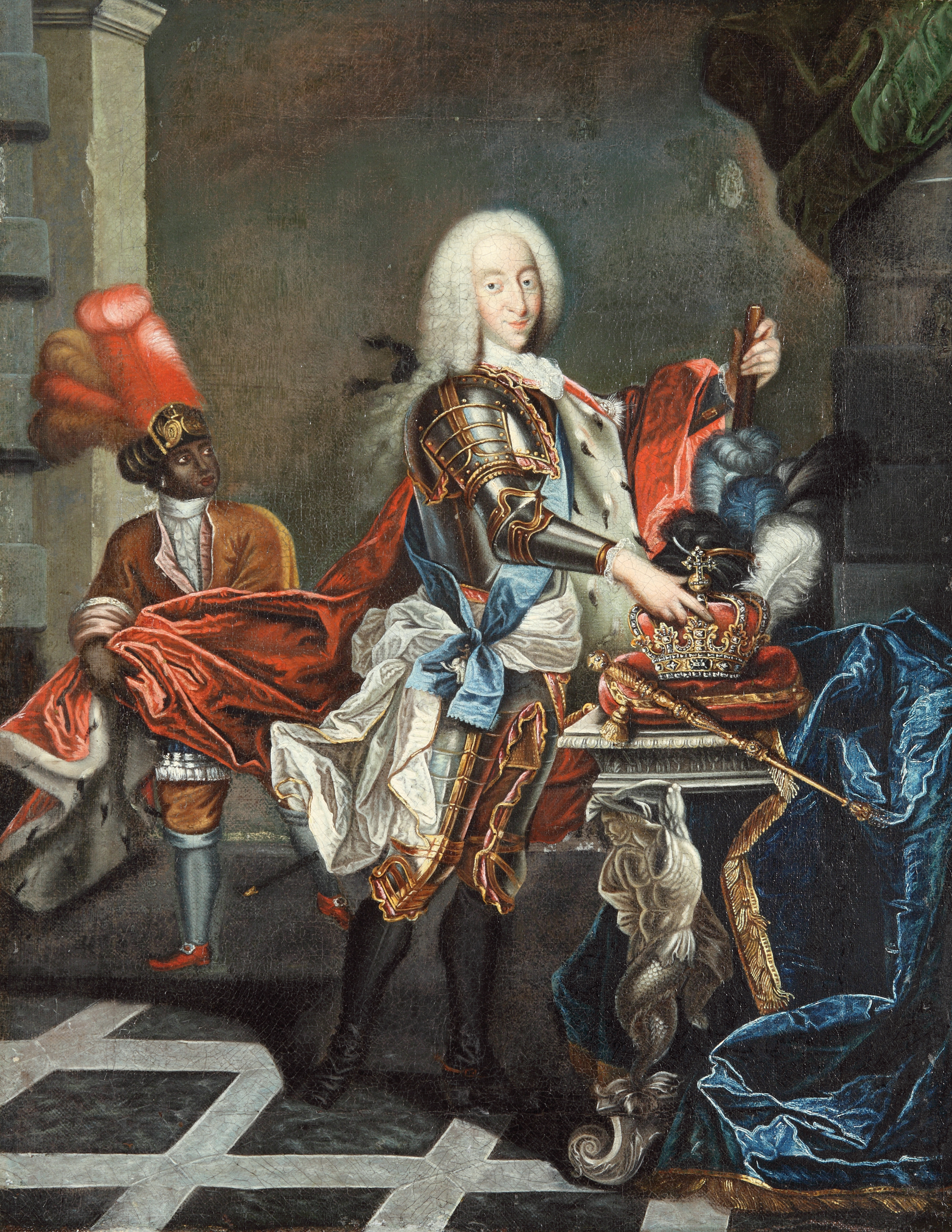
Christian VI placing his hand on the crown, accompanied by a page

For the first ten years of his government he consulted often with his cousin, Count Christian Ernst of Stolberg-Wernigerode. The count took part in almost everything, from the dismissal of cooks in the Queen's kitchen to determining alliance policy. He encouraged the king as long as possible to maintain the English alliance, which led to the marriage between Louise, the daughter of George II of Great Britain with the king's elder son Frederick.

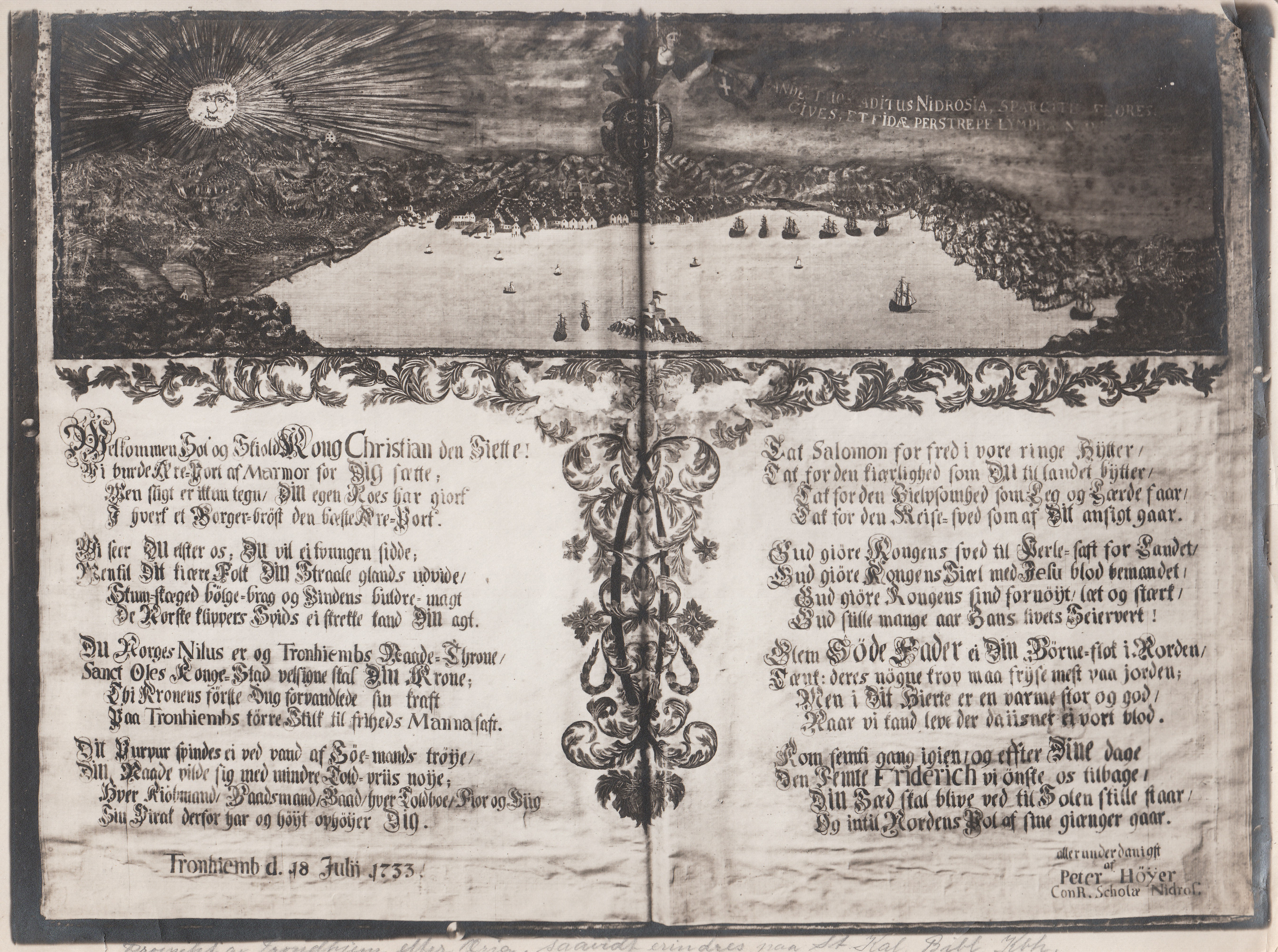
Engraving of poem/speech by Peter Höyer held on Christian VI's and his queen arrival to the city of Trondheim.

In 1733, the royal couple travelled to Norway. A poem/speech by Peter Höyer was performed in his honor when he visited the city of Trondheim on 18 July.

Christian's central domestic act was the introduction of the so-called adscription of 1733 (in Danish, stavnsbånd), a law that forced peasants to remain in their home regions, and by which the peasantry was subjected to both the local nobility and the army. Though the idea behind this law was probably to secure a constant number of peasant soldiers, it later was widely regarded as the ultimate subjugation of the Danish peasantry, and damaged Christian VI's reputation. The act would later be abolished in 1788.

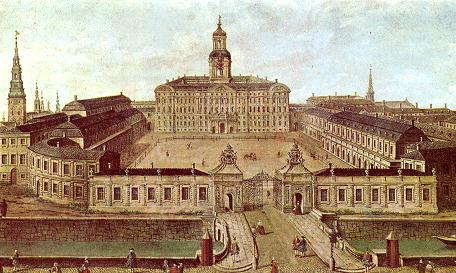
The Royal Palace of Christiansborg, named after him

The Pietist views of King Christian influenced much of his ecclesiastical polity although both nobility and many common people secretly resisted the king's influence. This did not mean that it was without effect. It had an influence on much of the poetry of the age including that of hymn writer Hans Adolph Brorson (1694–1764). Another lasting result of the king's efforts was the introduction of mandatory confirmation in 1736. This required some level of literacy, thereby promoting the need for a common school system, which was created by decree in 1739.

There were numerous building activities connected to Christian VI, and he was probably the greatest Danish builder of the 18th century; his queen also made a notable effort. Among their works are Christiansborg Palace (built 1732–1742, burned in 1794, rebuilt); Hirschholm Palace, a summer country retreat in North Zealand in current day Hørsholm municipality (built 1737–1739, demolished 1812); and the Eremitage (built 1734–1736, still standing). For Crown Prince Frederik (V) was built the Prince's palace in Kalveboderne (built 1743–1744, still standing as the National Museum). The construction of these expensive buildings was financed by Øresundstolden, with the purpose of representing the power and wealth of the Danish realm, but they also became an economic burden on the subjects.

Christian's foreign policy was a peaceful one and Denmark–Norway kept strictly neutral. In both trade and commerce, it was an age of advancement; some new companies and banks were founded. His plans to make their only daughter, Princess Louise, Queen of Sweden never came to fruition. During the election of the heir to the Swedish throne, both the prince of Zweibrücken-Birkenfeld and the prince of Mecklenburg were considered as candidates to be heir to the childless King Frederick I of Sweden. In 1743, Adolf Frederik of Holstein-Gottorp was elected Swedish heir.

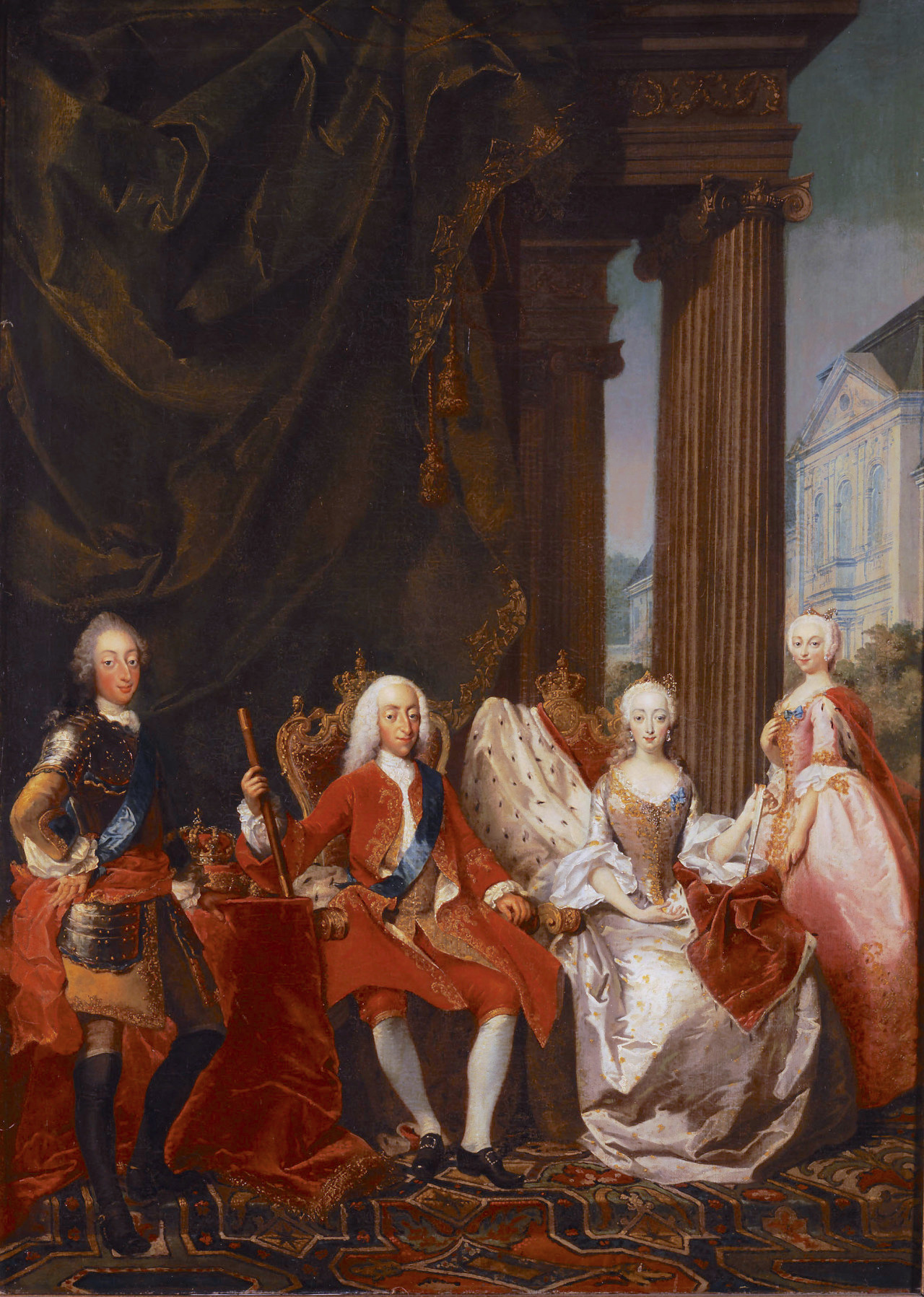
"The Family of Christian VI of Denmark–Norway 1744, painted by Carl Marcus Tuscher"; (L-R) Crown-Prince Frederick; King Christian VI; Queen Sophie Magdalene; and Crown-Princess Louise in the background is the summer residence of Hirschholm

=== Treaty of San Ildefonso ===
The Treaty of San Ildefonso of 1742, signed between Spain and Denmark–Norway, was a treaty of friendship, commerce and navigation by setting out the conditions that would govern commercial relations between the two countries. José del Campillo y Cossio on behalf of Philip V of Spain and Frederik Ludvig, Baron Dehn, by Christian VI, adjusted the agreement at the Royal Palace of La Granja de San Ildefonso on 18 July 1742. The treaty was never made effective: Spanish authorities considered that the exemption clause on half of the taxes for the import of Danish fish conflicted with other treaties with third countries, in which they were guaranteed preference in trade with Spain. In 1753 the agreement would be nullified.

=== Death ===
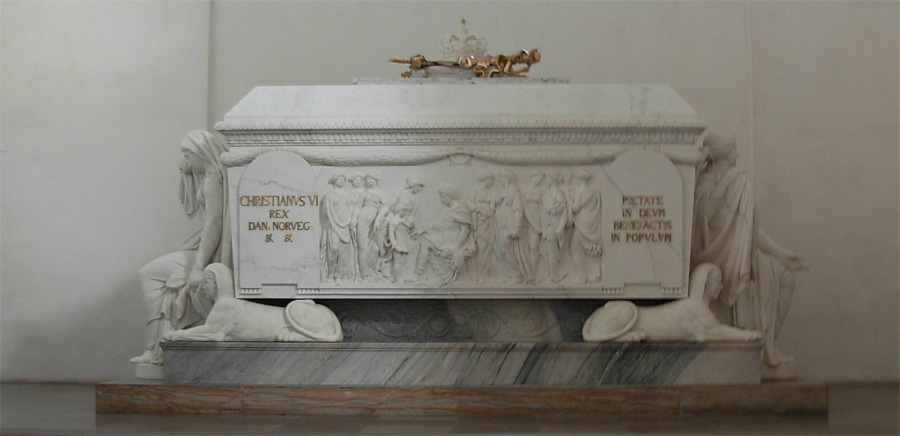
Christian VI's sarcophagus.

From his youth, Christian VI was sickly and chronically ill. On 6 August 1746 – the day before his silver marriage anniversary – the king died on Hirschholm Palace. Christian VI was interred in Roskilde Cathedral. The neoclassical memorial designed and produced by sculptor Johannes Wiedewelt was commissioned by the king's widow who upon his death.

The marble monument was completed in 1768, but not installed at Roskilde Cathedral until 1777. The monument includes a sarcophagus and two female figures, "Sorgen" ("Sorrow") and "Berømmelsen" ("Fame"). This was the first neoclassical sarcophagus in Denmark and is considered to mark the start of neoclassicism in that country.

=== Legacy ===
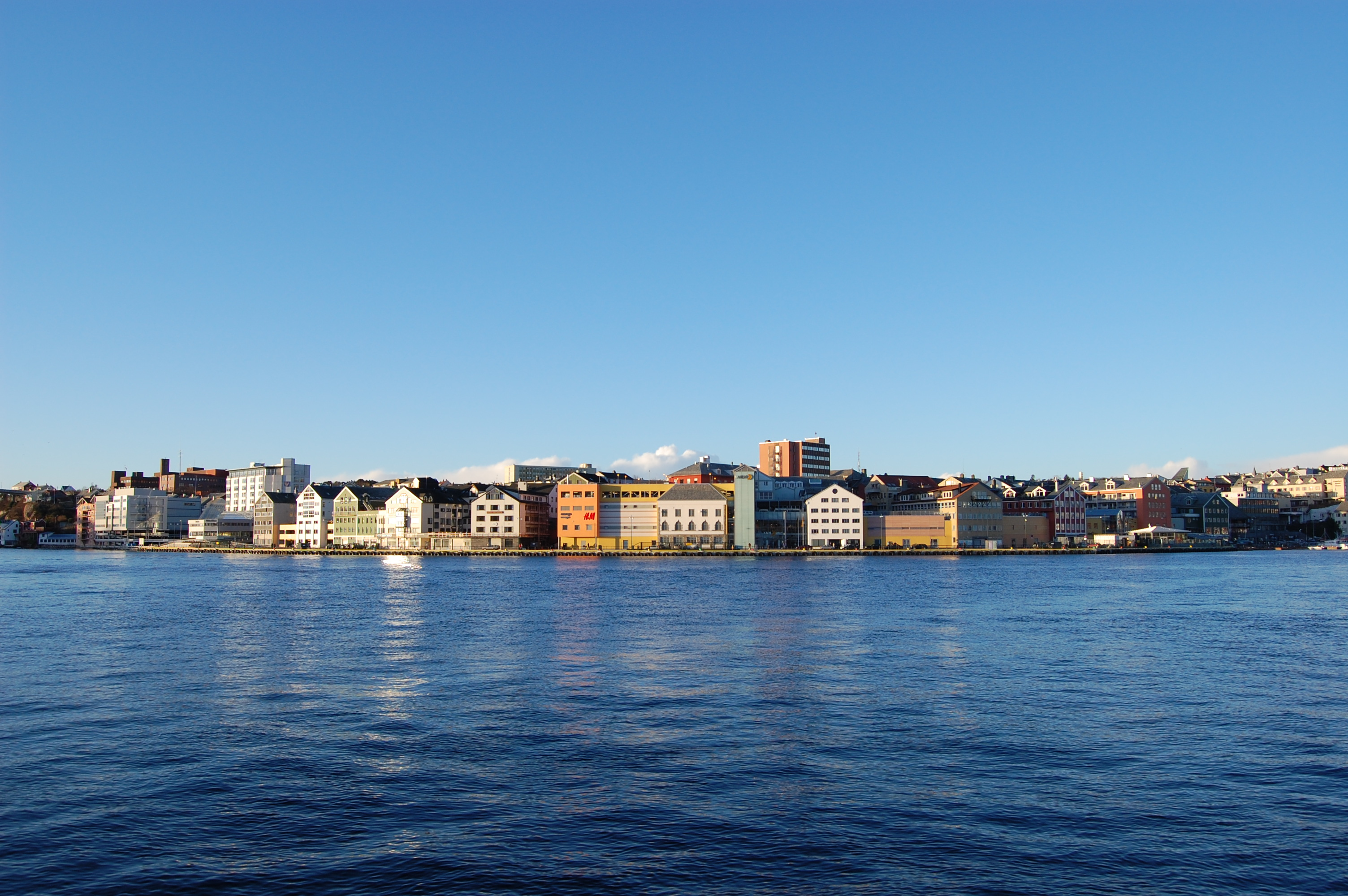
The city of Kristiansund.

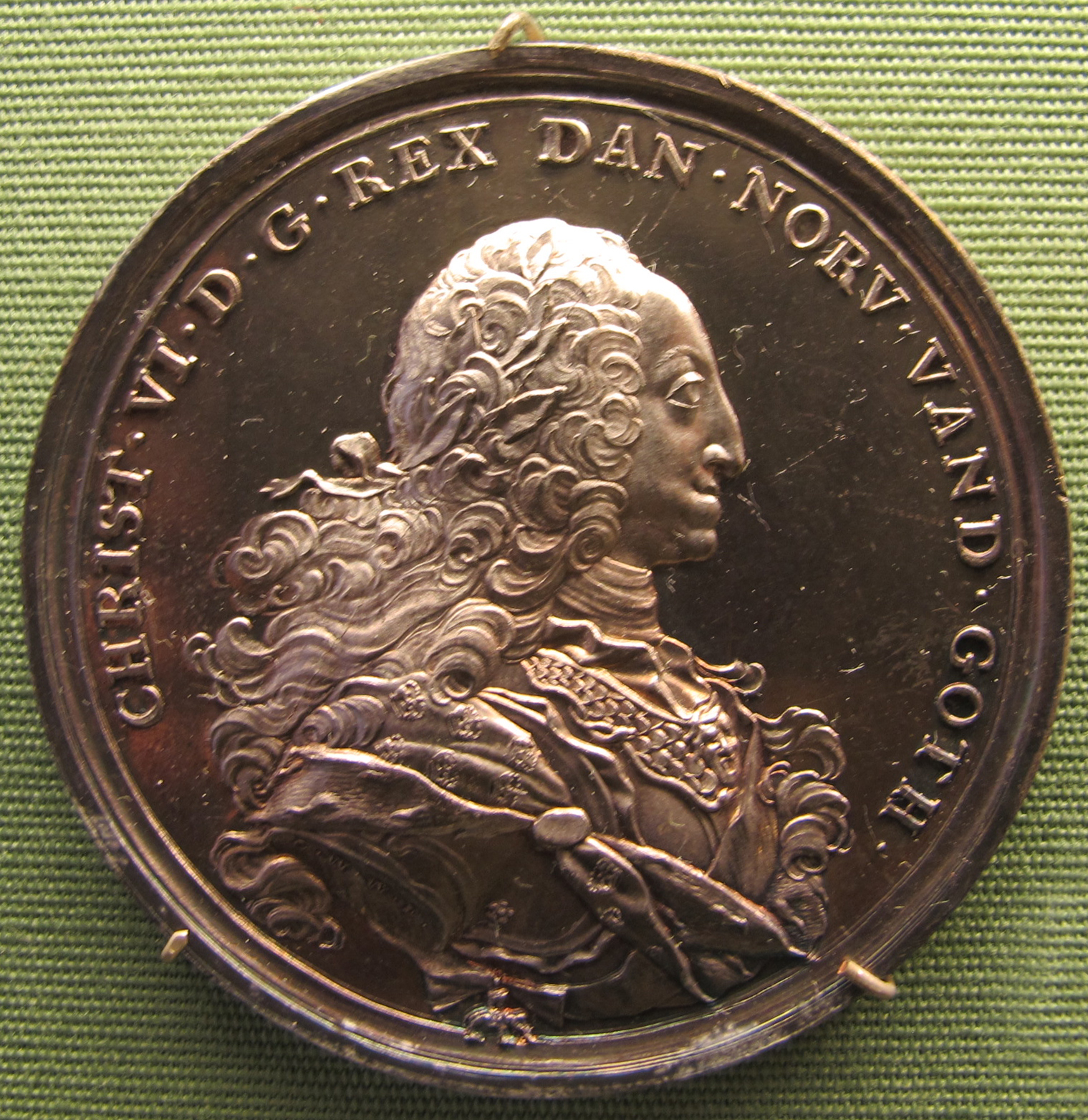
Silver medal of Christian VI, dated 1736.

To posterity, Christian VI is known foremost as a religious ruler. He was deeply devoted to Pietism, and during his entire reign he tried to impart its teachings to his subjects. The religious pressure he imposed, along with his lack of personal charm, made him one of the most unpopular of Denmark–Norway's absolutist kings; but he was the first who never went to war nor was involved in war.

The cities of Kristiansund in Norway and Christiansted on Saint Croix are named for him.

== Ancestry ==
Ancestors of Christian VI

8. Frederick III of Denmark
4. Christian V of Denmark
9. Sophie Amalie of Brunswick-Lüneburg
2. Frederick IV of Denmark
10. William VI, Landgrave of Hesse-Kassel
5. Charlotte Amalie of Hesse-Kassel
11. Margravine Hedwig Sophie of Brandenburg
1. Christian VI of Denmark
12. John Albert II, Duke of Mecklenburg-Güstrow
6. Gustav Adolf, Duke of Mecklenburg-Güstrow
13. Princess Eleonore Marie of Anhalt-Bernburg
3. Louise of Mecklenburg-Güstrow
14. Frederick III, Duke of Schleswig-Holstein-Gottorp
7. Princess Magdalene Sibylle of Holstein-Gottorp
15. Duchess Marie Elisabeth of Saxony

Christian VI House of Oldenburg Born: 30 November 1699 Died: 6 August 1746
Regnal titles
Preceded by Frederick IV	King of Denmark and Norway; Duke of Schleswig; Count of Oldenburg; 1730–1746	Succeeded by Frederick V
Preceded by Frederick IV and Charles Frederick	Duke of Holstein; 1730–1746 with Charles Frederick (1730–1739); Charles Peter Ulrich (1739–1746)	Succeeded by Frederick V and Charles Peter Ulrich
