= Germany–Norway relations =

Diplomatic contacts between the Federal Republic of Germany and the Kingdom of Norway

- Germany: Norway

Germany–Norway relations are bilateral relations between Germany and Norway.

Both countries established diplomatic relations in 1905, after Norway's independence. During World War II, Norway was occupied by Nazi Germany, lasting from 1940 until 1945.

Both countries are full members of NATO, and of the Council of Europe. As of 2022, there were around 15,000 Norwegians living in Germany and around 10,000 Germans living in Norway.

To promote the German-Norwegian relations, in 1982, the German-Norwegian Society, and in 1988, the German-Norwegian Friendship Society, were founded.

== Country comparison ==
Official name	Federal Republic of Germany	Kingdom of Norway
Flag		
Coat of Arms	Germany	Norway
Anthem	Deutschlandlied	Ja, vi elsker dette landet; Royal anthem: Kongesangen
National day	3 October	17 May
Capital city	Berlin	Oslo
Largest city	Berlin - 3,677,472 (Metro: 6,144,600)	Oslo - 709,037 (Metro: 1,588,457)
Government	Federal parliamentary constitutional republic	Unitary parliamentary constitutional monarchy
Head of State	Frank-Walter Steinmeier	Harald V of Norway
Head of Government	Friedrich Merz	Jonas Gahr Støre
Military	Bundeswehr	Norwegian Armed Forces
Official language(s)	German; Danish, Low German, Sorbian, Romani, and Frisian recognized as minority languages	Norwegian, Sami; Kven, Romani, and Scandoromani recognized as minority languages.
Religion	55% Christianity; 37,7% No religion 6,5% Islam; 0,8% Other	74,9% Christianity —68% Church of Norway —6,9% Other Christian; 21,2% No religion 3,1% Islam; 0,8% Others
Current Constitution	8 May 1949	17 May 1814
Area	357,114 km^{2} (137,882 sq mi)	385,207 km^{2} (148,729 sq mi)
EEZ	57,485 km^{2} (22,195 sq mi)	2,385,178 km^{2} (920,922 sq mi)
Time zones	1	1
Population	83,695,000	5,488,984
Population density	233/km^{2}	14.3/km^{2}
Expatriate populations	15,000 Norwegians in Germany as of 2022	10,000 Germans living in Norway as of 2022
Ethnic groups	80% Germans, 5% Turks, 5% other Europeans, 10% other	81.5% Norwegians, 18.5% non-Norwegians
GDP (nominal)	$4.031 trillion	$504 billion
GDP (nominal) per capita	$48,398	$92,646
GDP (PPP)	$5.317 trillion	$425 billion
GDP (PPP) per capita	$63,835	$78,128
HDI	0.959	0.970
Currency	Euro	Norwegian krone

== History ==
=== Early history ===
Both what is now Germany and Norway were settled by Proto-Germanic peoples. The Ahrensburg culture, named after the town of Ahrensburg in the German state of Schleswig-Holstein, originated mostly in the North German Plain and were the first known peoples to settle modern-day Norway. By the 2nd century AD, Proto-Norse evolved from Proto-Germanic in Scandinavia. This separated the West Germanic peoples (of whom Germans are associated) and the North Germanic (of whom the Norwegians are associated).

The Hanseatic League, a coalition of mostly German towns, engaged in trade relations with Norway. A kontor, a Hanseatic trading post, was established in Bergen, this first buildings in the area. This post dominated Norwegian trade for almost 400 years.

In 1315 Norway entered a large alliance with Denmark, Poland, Sweden, the Duchy of Pomerania and Duchy of Mecklenburg against the Margraviate of Brandenburg.

=== 20th and 21st centuries ===
Following the dissolution of the union between Norway and Sweden in 1905, the German Empire established relations with the Kingdom of Norway.

The 1914 Septemberprogramm authorized by German Chancellor Theobald von Bethmann Hollweg proposed the creation of a Central European Economic Union, comprising a number of European countries, including Germany and possibly Norway, in which, as the Chancellor secretly stressed, there was to be a semblance of equality among the member states, but in fact it was to be under German leadership to stabilize Germany's economic predominance in Central Europe, with co-author Kurt Riezler admitting that the union would be a veiled form of German domination in Europe (see also: Mitteleuropa). The plan failed amid Germany's defeat in the war.

In 1925 Germany signed the Svalbard Treaty, which recognizes the sovereignty of Norway over the archipelago of Svalbard in the Arctic Ocean, and grants signatories equal rights to engage in commercial activities and scientific research on the archipelago.

During World War II, Nazi Germany led an invasion of Denmark and Norway in Operation Weserübung in April 1940. Vidkun Quisling, a former foreign minister, was the leader of the Norwegian puppet state. The Norwegians were considered racially superior to the German people by Hitler, and plans were made to improve the country's infrastructure. The German occupation of Norway lasted until May 1945.

Norway, West Germany, and East Germany became members of the United Nations. West Germany and Norway also became members of NATO.

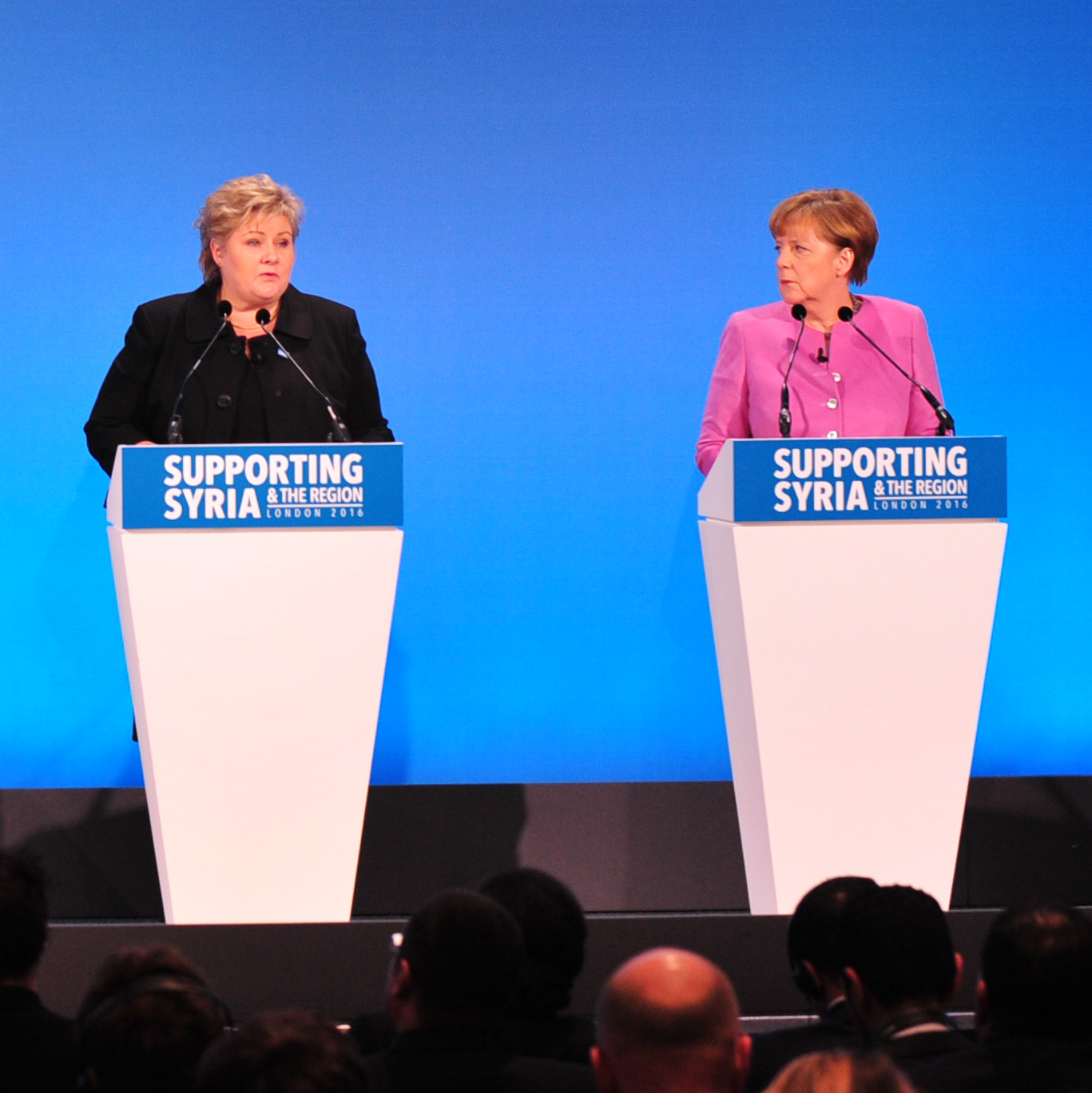
Erna Solberg and Angela Merkel in 2016

German and Norwegian leaders have established closer relations in recent times. Former Norwegian Prime Minister Erna Solberg's first overseas visit in November 2013 was to Angela Merkel in Germany. Likewise, Norwegian Prime Minister Jonas Gahr Støre met with German Chancellor Olaf Scholz and Vice Chancellor Robert Habeck.

=== Relationship with the European Union ===
Despite Norway's status as a non-EU member, Norway communicates with the European Union and has identified diplomatic focuses that will help it gain influence, one of which being Germany.

Norway is also a member of the European Economic Area and has other bilateral agreements with the European Union.

== Embassies ==
=== German diplomatic missions to Norway ===
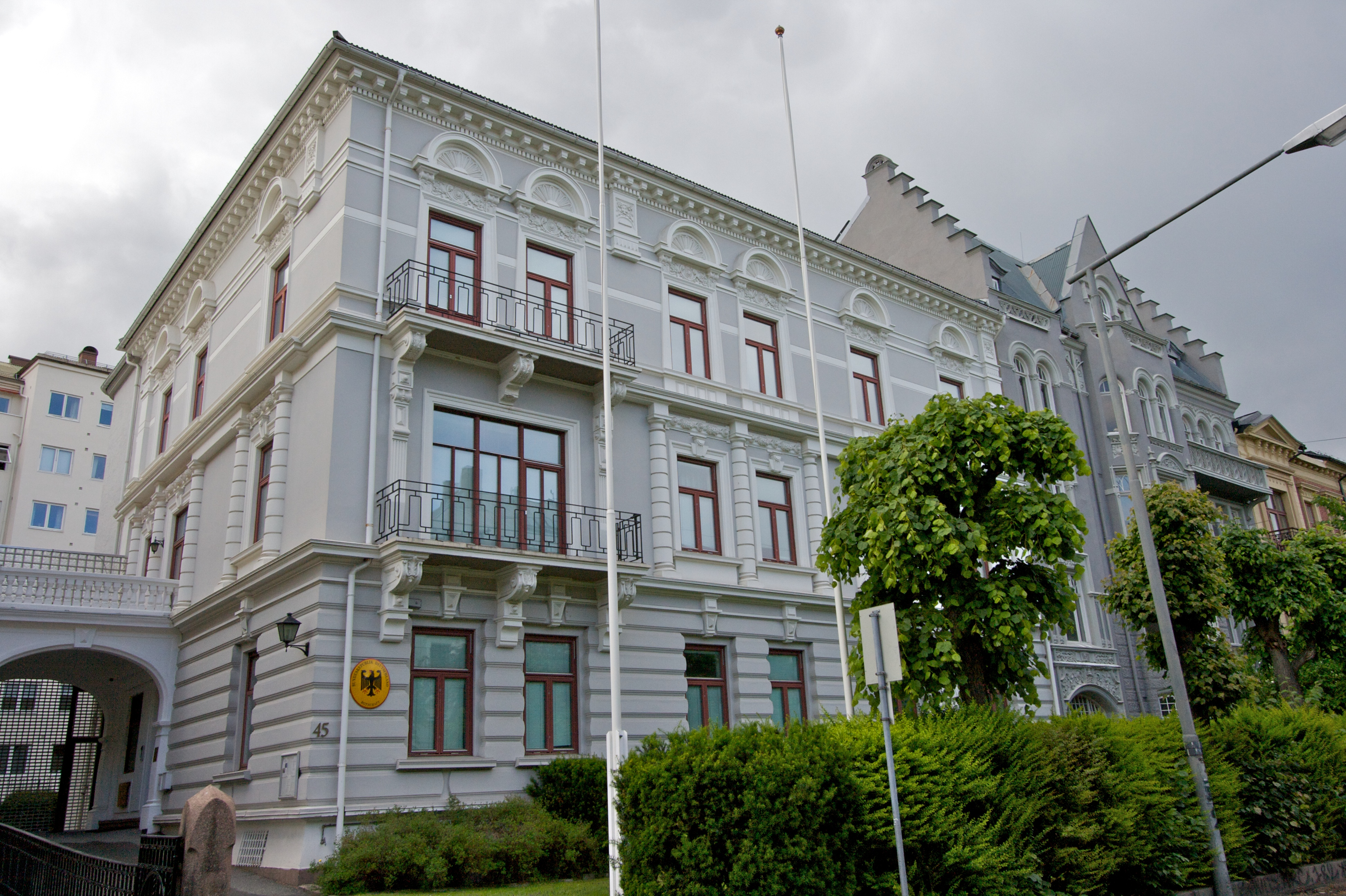
The German embassy in Oslo, Norway

Germany has one embassy in Oslo, and 8 honorary consuls in Ålesund, Bergen, Bodø, Kirkenes, Kristiansand, Stavanger, Tromsø, and Trondheim.

The German ambassador to Norway is Detlef Wächter. The honorary consuls are: Siri Reichel (Ålesund), Nils Børge Rokne (Bergen), Hege Alst (Bodø), Monika Christine Raab (Kirkenes), Lars Christian Jacobsen (Kristiansand), Per Arne Larsen (Stavanger), Ole-Martin Andreassen (Tromsø), and Kristin Offerdal (Trondheim).

=== Norwegian diplomatic missions to Germany ===
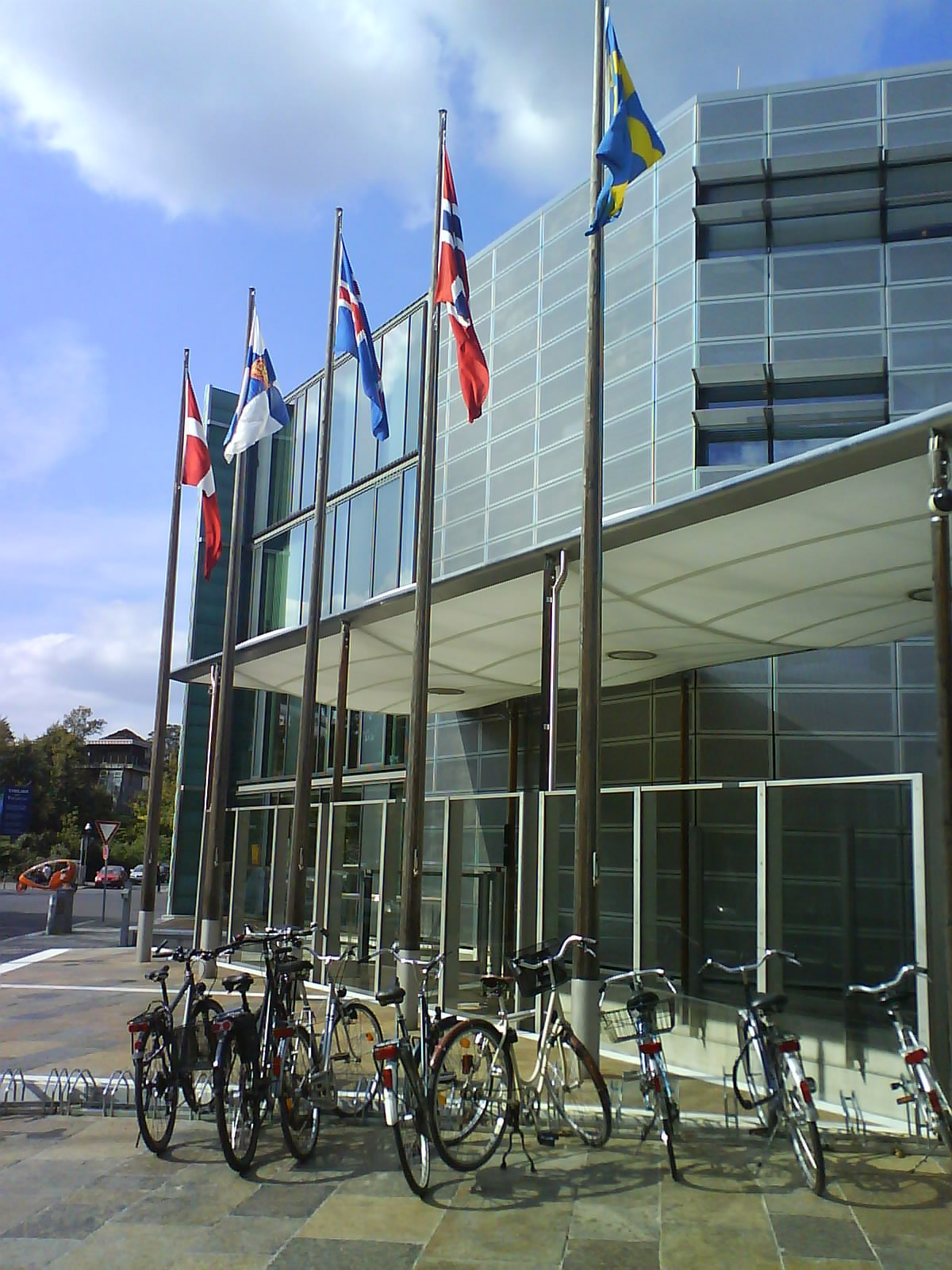
Embassies of the Nordic countries in Berlin, Germany

Norway has one embassy in Berlin in the Nordic Embassy Complex in Tiergarten and 11 honorary consuls in Bochum, Bremen, Frankfurt, Hamburg, Hanover, Kiel, Leipzig, Lübeck, Munich, Rostock, and Stuttgart.

The Norwegian ambassador to Germany is Torgeir Larsen. The honorary consuls are: Anja-Isabel Dotzenrath (Bochum), Hans-Christian Specht (Bremen), Axel Hellmann (Frankfurt), Tina Voß (Hanover), Arno Michael Witt (Kiel), Ulf Heitmüller (Leipzig), Petra Baader (Lübeck), Max J. Aschenbrenner (Munich), Oliver Brünnich (Rostock), and Thomas Edig (Stuttgart).

== Twinnings ==
- (Norway) Flekkefjord, Agder and (Germany) Misburg-Anderten, Lower Saxony since 1971.
- (Norway) Frogn, Akershus and (Germany) Mitte, Berlin since 1990.
- (Norway) Trondheim, Trøndelag and (Germany) Darmstadt, Hesse since 1968.
- (Norway) Haugesund, Rogaland and (Germany) Emden, Lower Saxony since 2009.
- (Norway) Lørenskog, Akershus and (Germany) Garching, Bavaria since 1974.
- (Norway) Hamar, Innlandet and (Germany) Greifswald, Mecklenburg-Vorpommern since 1997.
- (Norway) Dovre, Innlandet and (Germany) Gronau, Lower Saxony since 2002.
- (Norway) Kristiansand, Agder and (Germany) Münster, North Rhine-Westphalia since 1967.
- (Norway) Lillehammer, Innlandet and (Germany) Oberhof, Thuringia since 1993.
- (Norway) Haugesund, Rogaland and (Germany) Oettingen, Bavaria since 1971.
- (Norway) Skien, Telemark and (Germany) Rendsburg, Schleswig-Holstein since 1995.
- (Norway) Bergen, Vestland and (Germany) Rostock, Mecklenburg-Vorpommern since 1965.
- (Norway) Halden, Østfold and (Germany) Wismar, Mecklenburg-Vorpommern since 1991.

== Notable German-Norwegians ==
=== Norwegians of German descent ===
As members of the House of Glücksburg, descending from the House of Oldenburg, the sitting Norwegian Royal Family is also of German descent.

- Leif Kuhnle Grung (1894-1945) Architect
- Gerhard Armauer Hansen (1841-1912) Medical Scientist
- Christine B. Meyer (1964-) Chief Commissioner of Bergen
- Marit Warncke (1958-) Mayor of Bergen
- Christine Kahrs (1964-)Commissioner of Urban Development Bergen
- Johan Gerhard Theodor Ameln (1838–1917), merchant and politician.
- Nils Astrup (1778–1835), politician.
- Johan Henrich Berlin (1741–1807), composer and organist.
- Harald Beyer (1891–1960), literary historian.
- Karoline Bjørnson (1835–1934), actress.
- Harriet Bosse (1835–1934), actress.
- Harald Damsleth (1906–1971), cartoonist who worked for the Nasjonal Samling.
- Carl Dørnberger (1864–1940), painter.
- Anneli Drecker (1969–), singer and actress.
- Simone Eriksrud (1970–), musician.
- Gerd Fleischer (1942–), war child and activist, receiver of the Jenteprise.
- Ragnar Frisch (1895–1973), influential economist
- Fredrik Georg Gade (1830–1905), businessperson and politician
- Eyvind Getz (1888–1956), politician and former mayor of Oslo.
- Finn Graff (1938–), illustrator.
- Waldemar Hansteen (1857–1921), architect.
- Carl Dietrich Hildisch (1867–1949), businessperson and member of the Nasjonal Samling.
- Clara Holst (1868–1935), philologist and women's rights advocate.
- Hans Holtermann (c. 1709–1781), businessman and landowner.
- Sophus Kahrs (1918–1986), commander for the German SS.
- Caspar Kauffeldt (1773–1843), industrialist
- Halvdan Koht (1873–1965), historian and politician
- August Konow (1780–1873), businessman and politician
- Wollert Konow (1779–1839), merchant, politician, and vice consul
- Jürgen Christoph von Koppelow (1684–1770), nobleman and officer in the Great Northern War
- Karoline Krüger (1970–), singer, actress, and composer
- Hans Linstow (1787–1851), architect and designer of the Norwegian Royal Palace
- Morten Lyng Lossius (1819–1892), military officer, engineer, and politician
- Anni-Frid Lyngstad (1945–), singer-songwriter and environmentalist; founding member and lead singer of ABBA
- Catharina Lysholm (1744–1815), businesswoman and ship-owner.
- Carl von und zu Mansbach (1790–1867), military officer and diplomat.
- Linni Meister (1985–), model and singer.
- Edvard Moser (1962–), psychologist, neuroscientist, and professor.
- Ingunn Moser (1965–), sociologist and university and health executive.
- Arne Næss Jr. (1937–2004), businessman and mountaineer.
- Benjamin Wegner Nørregaard (1861–1935), journalist and army officer.
- Henriette Pauss (1841-1918), teacher, editor, humanitarian, and missionary leader.
- Peter Arnoldus Petersen (1851–1916), businessman.
- Johan Christopher Ræder (1782–1853), military officer.
- Johan Georg Ræder (1751–1808), military officer.
- Pål Refsdal (1963–), journalist, photographer, and filmmaker.
- Georg Reichwein (1630–1710), military leader.
- Georg Richter (1915-1972), actor.
- Olaus Michael Schmidt (1784-1851), judge and politician.
- Cecilie Christine Schøller (1720-1786), socialite, land owner, and businessperson.
- Emil Schreiner (1831-1910), philologist and educator.
- Kristian Schreiner (1874-1957), professor of medicine.
- Carl Schulz (1851-1944), educator and politician.
- Tellef Dahll Schweigaard (1806-1886), politician.
- Vebjørn Selbekk (1969–), newspaper editor and author.
- Wilhelm Christian Suhrke (1863-1950), architect and politician.
- Michael Tetzschner (1954–), politician.
- Olav Anton Thommessen (1946–), contemporary composer.
- Jørgen Thormøhlen (c.1640–1708), merchant, shipowner, slave trader, and industrialist.
- Vicky Vette (1965–), porn star.
- Lars-Christopher Vilsvik (1988–), footballer.
- Jon Stephenson von Tetzchner (1967–), programmer and businessman.
- Georg Reinholdt Wankel (1843-1907), politician.
- Johan Peter Weisse (1832-1886), philologist.
- Dikken Zwilgmeyer (1853–1913), fiction writer.

==== Families ====
- Cappelen
- Von der Lippe

=== Germans of Norwegian descent ===
- Niklas Andersen (1988–), footballer.
- Matthias Brandt (1961–), actor and audiobook narrator, son of former Chancellor Willy Brandt
- Thordis Brandt (1940–), American actress.
- Johann Siegwald Dahl (1827–1902), animal painter.
- Isabel Freese (1979–), dressage rider.
- Olaf Andreas Gulbransson (1916–1961), architect.
- Karen Horney (1885–1952), psychoanalyst.
- Princess Marie Luise Charlotte of Hesse-Kassel (1814–1895), princess of Anhalt-Dessau.
- David McAllister (1971–), politician.
- Bjørn Melhus (1966–), film and installation artist.
- Miriam Neureuther (1990–), biathlete and cross-country skier.
- Hans Thomsen (1891–1968), German Nazi diplomat.
- Georg Uecker (1962–), German actor.

==== Immigrants ====
- Jørn Andersen (1963–), football manager.
- Rut Brandt (1920–2006), writer and Willy Brandt's wife.
- Carl Frithjof Smith (1859–1917), painter
- Kirsten Heiberg (1907–1976), actor who worked on a propaganda film for the Nazis.
- Christian Lassen (1800–1876), orientalist and Indologist.
- Vincent Stoltenberg Lerche (1837–1892), painter, illustrator, and author.
- Ludvig Munthe (1841–1896), landscape painter.
- Georg Anton Rasmussen (1842–1914), landscape painter.
- Per Schwenzen (1899–1984), screenwriter, writer, and translator
