= Jan Voigt =

Norwegian actor (1928–1997)

- Born: June 24, 1928; Bærum, Norway
- Died: December 5, 1997 (aged 69); Trondheim, Norway
- Occupation: Actor

Jan Voigt (24 June 1928 – 5 December 1997) was a Norwegian actor, dancer and museum director.

== Biography ==
He was born in Bærum as a son of Charles Antonius Voigt (1891–1962) and Nathalie Reuter Sande (1896–1986). He became a student at the Centralteatret where he made his stage debut in 1950, and remained there for four years. He was then a freelance actor, mainly at Edderkoppen, Chat Noir and Trøndelag Teater. Films include I moralens navn (1954), På solsiden (1956), and Elskere (1963).

From 1963 to 1993, he served as director of Ringve Museum, the national museum of music and musical instruments in Trondheim.

Voigt was also a dancer and was also a presenter in the Norwegian Broadcasting Corporation television, hosting shows such as Firklang (1965) and Taushet er gull (1971). Voigt continued to be associated with Eurovision, by hosting the Melodi Grand Prix in 1967, 1968, 1971, and 1976.

Voigt was a board member of Norske kunst- og kulturhistoriske museer, Trondheim Symphony Orchestra and Olavsfestdagene. In 1980 he received Sør-Trøndelag County's Cultural Award (Sør-Trøndelag fylkes kulturpris).

He was appointed a Knight 1st Class of the Royal Norwegian Order of St. Olav in 1980. He died in December 1997 in Trondheim.

Cultural offices
| Preceded by Victoria Bachke | Director of Ringve Museum; 1963–1993 | Succeeded by Søren Hjorth |
