= Suhrke =

Suhrke is a surname. Notable people with the surname include:

- Eirik Suhrke, Norwegian indie composer
- Tor Oddmund Suhrke, Norwegian musician
- Wilhelm Christian Suhrke (1863–1950), Norwegian architect and politician
