= Hørsholm Riding Club =

Danish equestrian club

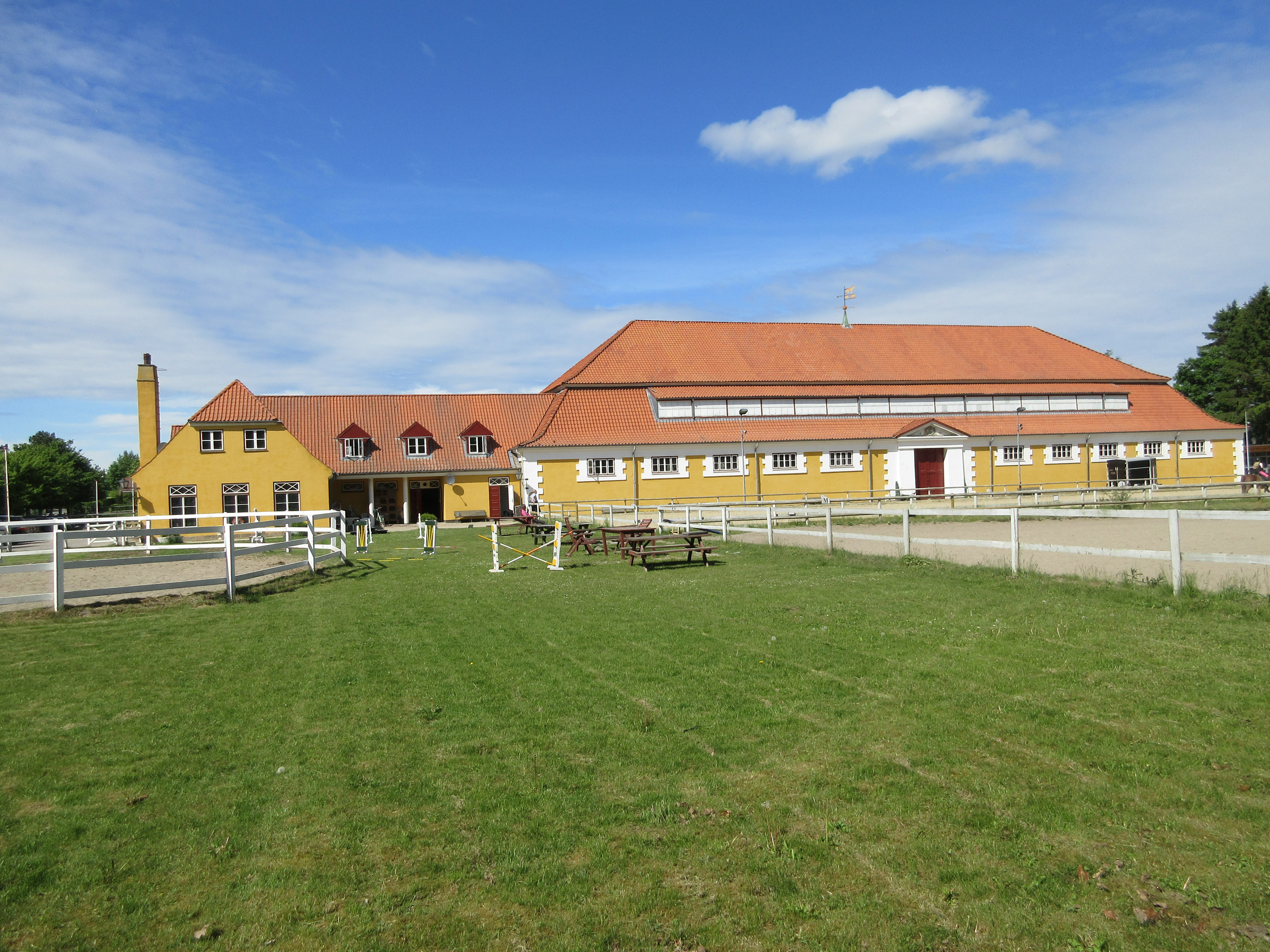
Hørsholm Riding Club

Hørsholm Riding Club (Danish: Hørsholm Rideklub) is one of the oldest riding clubs in Denmark. It is located on Folehavevej in association with Folehave Forest in Hørsholm on the northern outskirts of Copenhagen. Its riding hall, a Baroque style structure originally built by Lauritz de Thurah for the Royal Frederiksborg Stud in Hillerød in the mid-1740s, was moved to its current location in 1939.

== History ==
Hørsholm Riding Club was founded in 1934 with Svend Egede Glahn, Hartvig Rasmussen, Poul Manicus-Hansen, Jørgen Møller-Holst, Fritze Wedell-Wedellsborg, Vagn Olrik, Erik Glud and Harald Høgsbro as the driving forces. Its name was then Sportsrideklubben for Hørsholm og Omegn” (The Sports Riders' Club for Hørsholm and Surroundings).

Riding took place in the forests surrounding Folehavegård and in a meadow to its rare as well as on "Kæmpehøjen" (Burial Mound), and a show jumping course located at Sønder Jagtvej, west of Villa Lyskov. It was then possible to follow Bridle paths all the way down to the beach at Rungsted Harbour. Many of the members were people from Copenhagen who spend their summers in country houses in the area.

The winters were often too cold for riding and in 1939 a group of members therefore decided to buy the old riding hall at Hillerødsholm in Hillerød which had fallen into disrepair and was destined for demolition. The large Baroque style building was from 1744–45 and had been built for the Royal Frederiksborg Stud to design by Lauritz de Thurah. The building was dismantled and rebuilt at a site donated by the owners of Folehavegård, Knud and Ellen Dahl. The latter was the sister of the writer Karen Blixen.
