= Wollert Konow =

Wollert Konow may refer to:

- Wollert Konow (merchant) (1779–1839), Norwegian merchant, also a politician
- Wollert Konow (prime minister) (1845–1924), Norwegian politician, often referred to as "Wollert Konow (SB)"
- Wollert Konow (Hedemarken politician) (1847–1932), Norwegian politician, represented the district of Hedemarken, cousin of the above, often referred to as "Wollert Konow (H)"
