= Johan Daniel Berlin =

German-born Norwegian musician

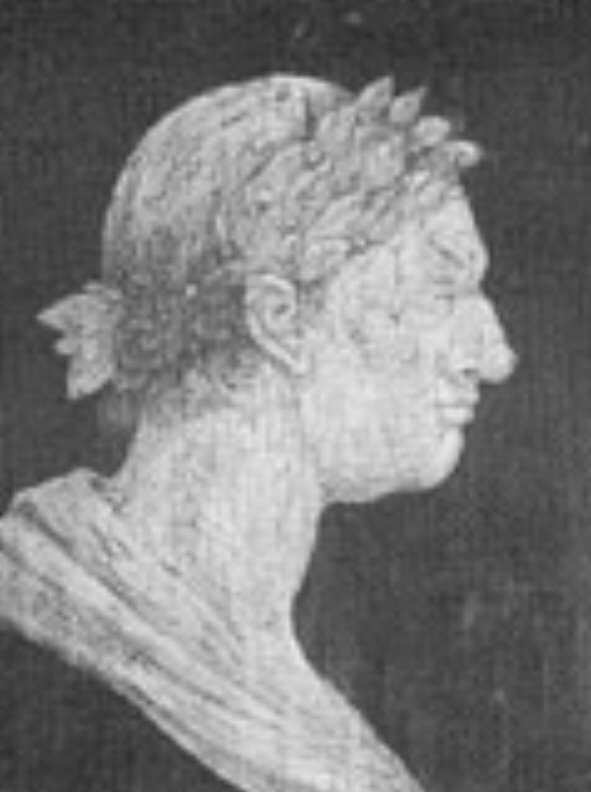
Engraving of Johan Daniel Berlin on a locket from 1786. Now at Ringve Museum.

Johan Daniel Berlin (born 12 May 1714, Memel, Prussia – 4 November 1787, Trondheim, Norway) was a German-born Norwegian rococo composer and organist, remembered as one of the founders of the Royal Norwegian Society of Sciences and Letters.

== Life ==
He was born in Memel (now Klaipėda, Lithuania). At the age of nineteen, he came to Copenhagen, starting out as an apprentice to the privileged town musician there, Andreas Berg. In 1737, he became the privileged town musician in Trondheim. In 1741, he became organist of the Nidaros Cathedral (1741–1787) and Vår Frue Church (1752–1761). In addition, he held the positions as captain of the fire brigade and inspector of the water-works, practiced as an architect, land-surveyor, artisan, constructor and maker of instruments, made a series of meteorological, geomagnetic, and astronomical observations, and was for 38 years an active member of the Royal Norwegian Society of Sciences and Letters.

He allegedly composed many works, but only a few of his compositions have been preserved. His book, Musicaliske Elementer (Musical Elements), printed in Trondheim in 1744, was the first Norwegian textbook on the theory of music and instruments.

His son was Johan Henrich Berlin.

== List of compositions ==
=== Works for harpsichord ===
1. Dances (composed with his son, Johan Heinrich Berlin)
2. Sonata in D minor
3. Allegro
4. Aria
5. Minuet, no. 15, no. 18, no. 40, no. 45, no. 48, no. 49.

=== Works for orchestra ===
1. Symphony no. 1 in D major
2. Symphony no. 2 in D major
3. Symphony no. 3 in D major
4. Violin concerto in A major

== Literature ==
- Johan Daniel Berlin: The Collected Works of Johan Daniel Berlin, edited by Bjarne Kortsen. Bergen: editio norvegica 1977.
- Karl Dahlback: Rokokkomusikk i trøndersk miljø. Johan Henrich Berlin (1741–1807). Norsk musikkgranskning.ZDB-ID 401397-9 p. 137-274.
