= Amaliegade 13 =

Building in Copenhagen, Denmark

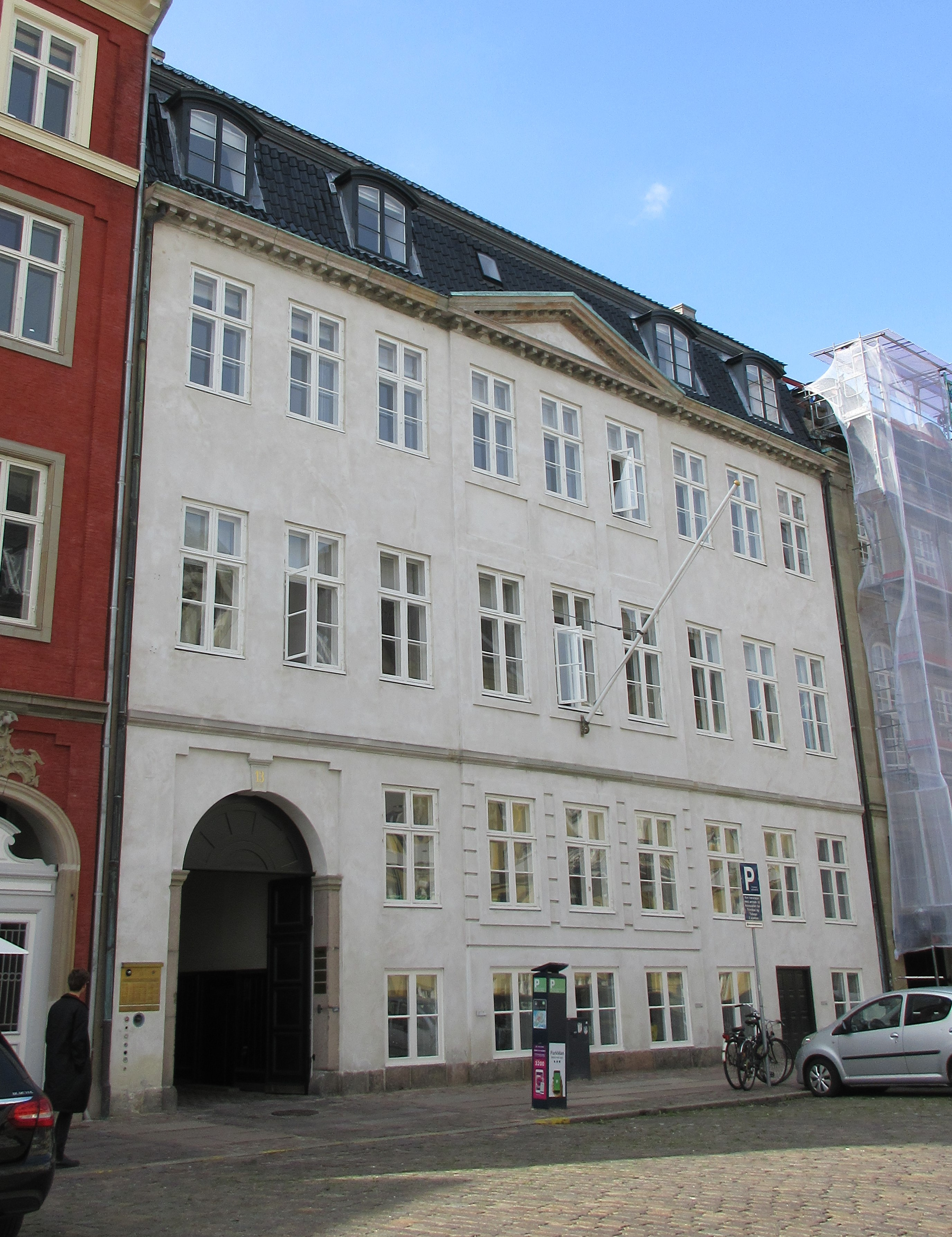
- Interactive map of the Amaliegade 13 area

General information
- Location: Copenhagen, Denmark
- Coordinates: 55°40′58.48″N 12°35′31.4″E
- Completed: 1756

Design and construction
- Architect: Nicolai Eigtved

Amaliegade 13 is a historic property on Amaliegade in the Frederiksstaden Quarter of central Copenhagen, Denmark. Originally tenement houses, it was later converted into the city home of count Frederik Christian Danneskiold-Samsøe.

== History ==
=== Niels Gundersen and Andreas Lund ===
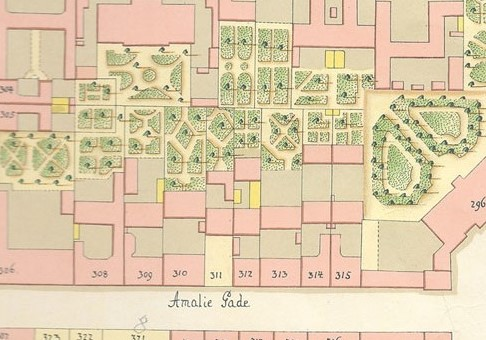
No. 313 seen in a detail from Christian Gedde's map of St. Ann's Rast Quarter, 1757

The undeveloped lot was acquired by Niels Gundersen Lund on 29 April 1750. It was 30 alen wide and 131 alen deep. Gundersen's plans for the site comprised a seven bay, three-storey building facing the street, a 10-bay side wing and a 15-bay rear wing. The two half-timbered rear wings had almost been completed by June 1751 but the construction of the main wing was delayed for economic reasons. In a letter to the king dated 7 December 1753, Gundersen applied for permission to build a brewery at the site. Alternatively, he offered to build a rectory at the site if the king would appoint his son to pastor at the new Frederick's Church that was planned in the area. The application for permission to open a brewery was rejected on 25 February 1865 and the request of a priesthood for his son seems to have simply been ignored. It is unclear whether construction of the building had commenced when Gundersen died later that same year but it was completed by his son in 1755.

Lund used the complex as a tenement house. The building fronting the street contained two apartments on each floor. The 14-bay cross wing which had been built by Lund's father contained four apartments on each floor. A 10-bay single-storey rear wing with Mansard roof was completed in 1761. It contained stabling for six horses and remises for two carriages in the ground floor.

In the new cadastre of 1756, the property was listed as No. 71 Y. In Christian Gedde's map of St. Ann's East Quarter, it was marked as No. 3153.

In 1762, it was home to around one hundred residents. Lund, who also owned a property in Pilestræde, resided with his family in one of the apartments in the ground floor of the cross wing. Anna Fischer, whose husband, Admiral Olfert Fas Fischer, had died the previous year, lived with her nine children, two maids and a servant in the two apartments on the first floor of the main wing. One of the children was the then 16 years old naval cadet Olfert Fischer.

=== Danneskiold-Samsøe, Meincke and Fix ===
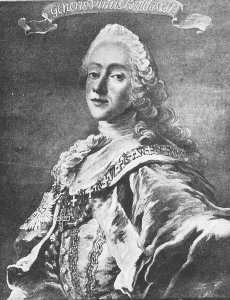
Frederik Christian Danneskiold-Samsøe

On 17 December 1763, Lund sold the property to Postmaster-General Frederik Christian Danneskiold-Samsøe (1722-1778) who immediately converted it into a suitable townhouse. The mezzanine was heightened into a full floor and the saddle roof was replaced by a mansard roof. Danneskiold-Samsøe resided on the first and second floors, the attic contained the maids' rooms and the kitchen was located in the basement. The ground floor was a separate apartment which was either rented out or put at the disposal of a member of the family. The rear wing with apartments and the stable wing were demolished and two six-bay side wings were built in their place. The one to the left contained stabling for seven horses, a remise for a single carriage and two toilets. The one to the right contained a remise and storage space for firewood.

Danneskiold-Samsøe died on 26 March 1778 in Copenhagen. His widow kept the house in Amaliegade for a couple of years but sold it to Lorentz Angel Meincke on 23 March 1782 for 16,000 Danish rigsdaler. Johan Leonhard Fix (1735-1807) purchased the building in 1787. He had just moved to Copenhagen after serving as governor of Danish India.

=== Conversion into apartments ===
Fix died on 2 February 1807. Harald cib Rothe (1781-1848), a son-in-law, acquired Amaliegade 13 in auction on 8 May that same year. He was an artillery captain and already the owner of the estate Aggersvold. He converted the property in Amaliegade into three high-end apartments. A new side wing with kitchen facilities was constructed. Rothe sold the property to merchant Johan Gregorius Veith before the renovation had been completed in 1809 but with a ten-year lease on some of the rooms. J. D. Brandis (1762-1845), Queen Marie Sophia's physician, was a resident in the building in 1811.

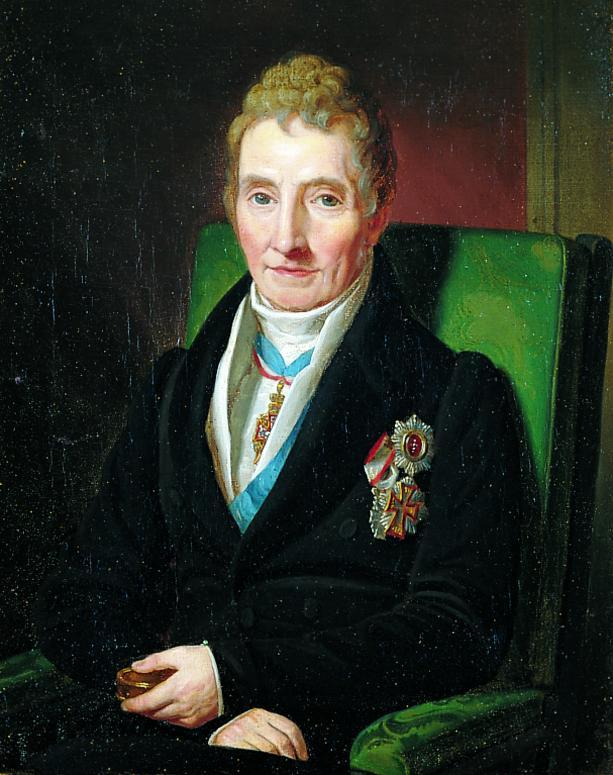
Johan Sigismund von Møsting, who owned the building from 1818 to 1846

Veith was hit hard by the state bankruptcy in 1813 and had to sell the house in Amaliegade in 1818. The new owner was the politician Johan Sigismund von Møsting. Mösting occupied the apartments on the two lower floors.

Johan Gunder Adler, Crown Prince Christian Frederik's cabinet secretary, resided in the apartment on the second floor from 1831. He lived there until his death in 1852 and his widow moved out the following year.

Møsting died in 1843. His widow sold the property in 1847 but lived in the apartment on the ground floor until her death in 1850. In 1845, 83 year old Joachim Dietrich Brandis, the queen's physician, had returned to the building. He now lived in the apartment on the first floor with his 30 years younger wife and their two children. Brandis died later that same year and the rest of the family moved out shortly thereafter.

The new owner of the property was Lauritz Schmidt. He had served as pharmacist in Nakskov from 1732 to 1842 before moving to Copenhagen where he became the proprietor of a sugar refinery. He had previously been the owner of several prominent properties such as the Dehn Mansion in Bredgade (1842), Hellerupgård in Hellerup and the Peschier House in Holmens Kanal.

In 1852, Amaliegade 13 was sold in auction to the merchant Josva From. He initially lived in the apartment of the first floor with his wife and two nieces. Ferdinand Victor Rottbøll, the owner of Holbæk Ladegård, resided in the apartment on the ground floor from 1854 to 1858. The apartment on the ground floor had by 1860 been taken over by the From family. Nicolai Ulrich Fugl, the later bank manager of Privatbanken, lived in the apartment on the second floor with his wife and eight children from 1854 to 1862. They had previously lived on St. Thomas in the Danish West Indies. Diderich Cappelen, the owner of Hollen Iron Works in Norway, lived in the apartment on the first floor from 1858. His widow and daughter moved to Christiania after his death in 1866.

=== The Konow family ===
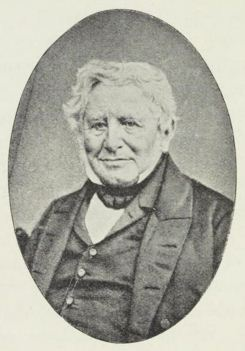
August Konow

From died on 25 March 1860 and his wife just a few days later. Amaliegade 13 was then sold in auction on 7 July to August Konow, a merchant from Bergen, whose wife had died in 1856. Konow lived in the building from 1761. He was the owner of a large painting collection of mainly Dutch and Italian paintings. J. C. Dahl, his close friend, had assisted him with selecting the paintings and was also represented in the collection with 10 works. Konow was also the owner of a country house known as Villa KonoW in Springforbi on the coast north of the city.

One of Konow's five children, Hans Konow, followed his father to Copenhagen. He lived with his family in the apartment on the apartment on the ground floor from 1762. He took over the house in Amaliegade as well as the country house in Springforbi when his father died at the age of 93 in 1873.

The painter Herman Vedel lived on the first floor from 1934 and until his death in 1848.

== Architecture ==
The building consists of three storeys over a high cellar. It is nine bays wide and has a triangular pediment over the three central bays.

== Today ==
The complex has been converted into 15 condos. The property development company Ceraco is based on the third floor.

== See also ==
- Listed buildings in Copenhagen Municipality
