= Rolf Rude =

Norwegian painter (1899–1971)

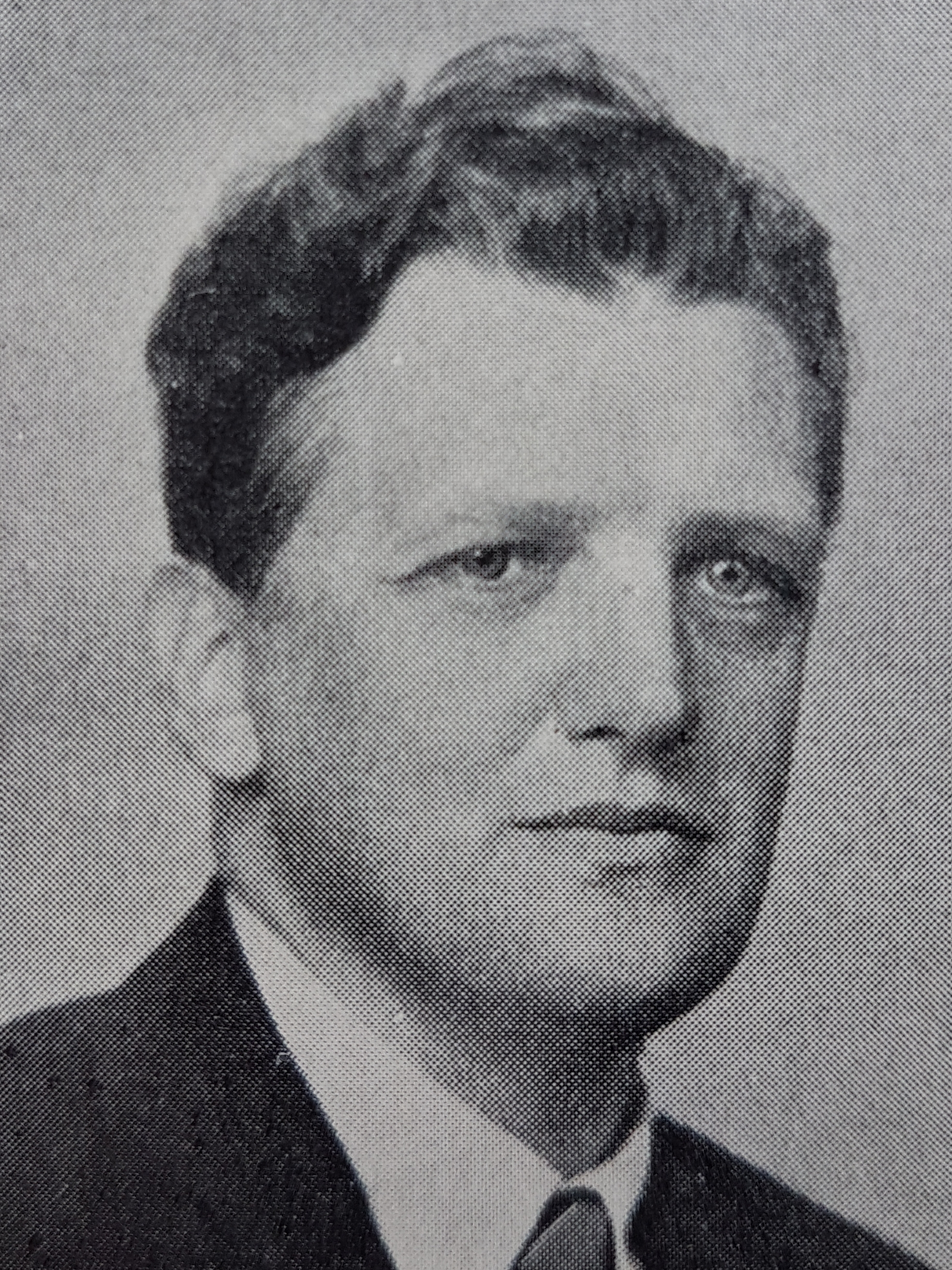
A picture of Rolf Rude

Rolf Rude (2 April 1899 – 5 November 1971) was a Norwegian painter.

He was born in Oslo as a son of photographer Ernest Rude. He is represented in the National Gallery of Norway with six paintings and several woodcuts. He chaired the Association of Norwegian Printmakers from 1953 to 1964 and Bildende Kunstneres Styre from 1964 to 1967. He resided in Bærum, later in Ullern.
