= Thomas Konow =

Norwegian naval officer and politician

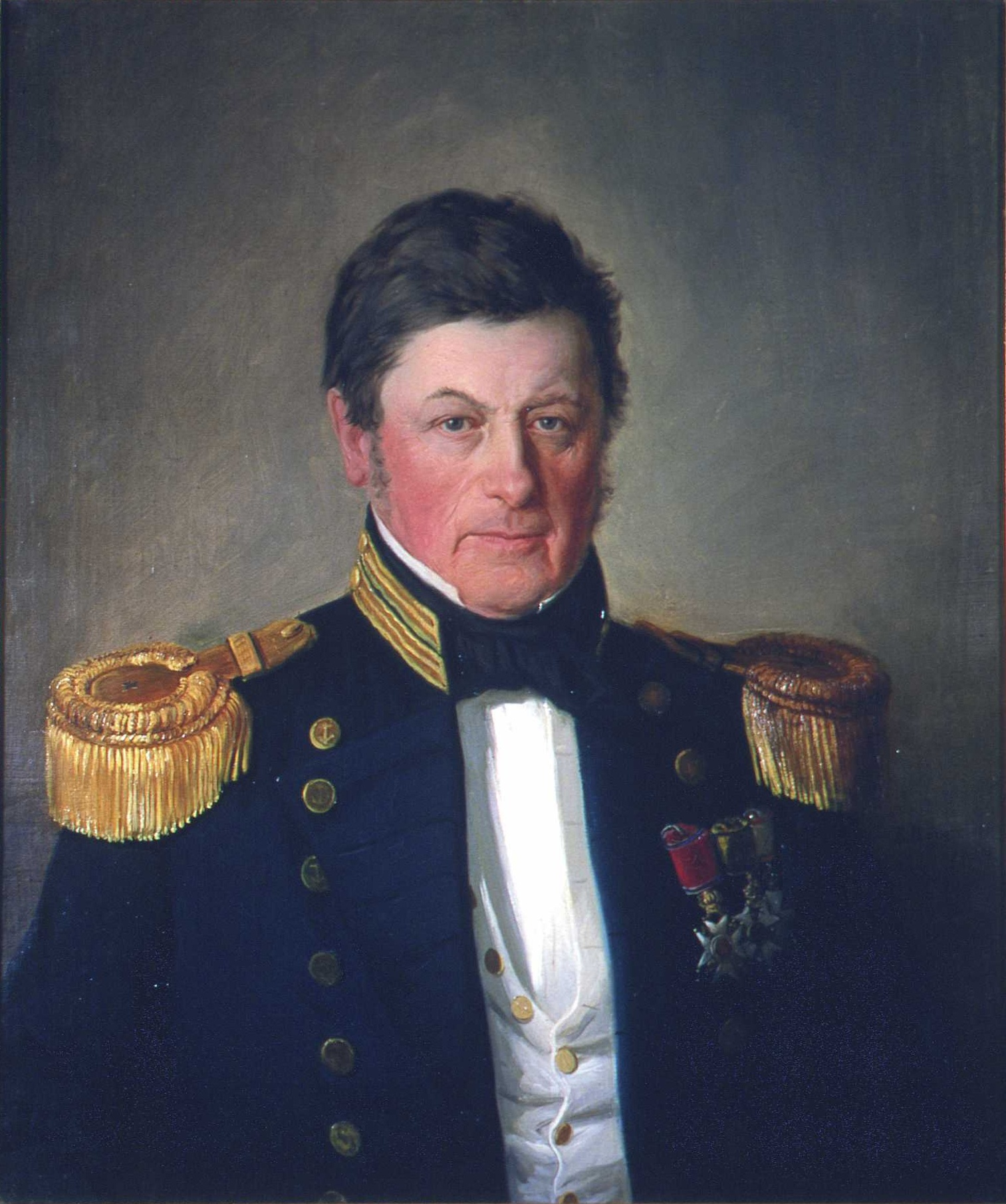
Thomas Konow painted by Knud Bergslien

Thomas Konow (10 October 1796 – 10 October 1881) was a Norwegian naval officer and politician. He was a member of the Norwegian Constituent Assembly at Eidsvoll in 1814.

== Background ==
He was born in Bergen, Norway as a son of merchant Friedrich Ludwig Konow (1746–1798) and his wife Anna Hedvig Rieck (1756–1810). His father and uncle had migrated from Germany to Norway; the surname stemming from the village, Konau. Thomas Konow was a brother of the merchant-politicians Wollert Konow and August Konow. In March 1827 he married Catharina Magdalene Reichborn (1807–1844).

== Career ==
Starting in 1805 as a cadet in the Danish-Norwegian navy, he was promoted to Junior Lieutenant in 1813 and served on the brig Lolland in Norwegian waters. On 6 May 1814 his name was removed from the list of Danish Naval Officers as he had transferred his allegiance to Norway after these two countries separated after the Treaty of Kiel. Lolland became a Norwegian vessel at the same time. He was a member of the Constituent Assembly at Eidsvold in 1814 as a representative of Vestfold. He supported the position of the Independence Party (Selvstendighetspartiet). The youngest member of the Assembly, at his death he was the last surviving member.

In the Norwegian navy, he was promoted to Senior Lieutenant (6 October 1821), and through the various ranks of Captain to Rear Admiral and Chief of the Navy (11 July 1860). He served as a temporary councillor of state in interim in 1861. He retired 10 October 1869.

== Other sources ==
- T. A. Topsøe-Jensen, Emil Marquard (1935) Officerer i den dansk-norske Søetat 1660-1814 og den danske Søetat 1814-1932 (in Danish)
