= Arthur Quentin de Gromard =

French musician

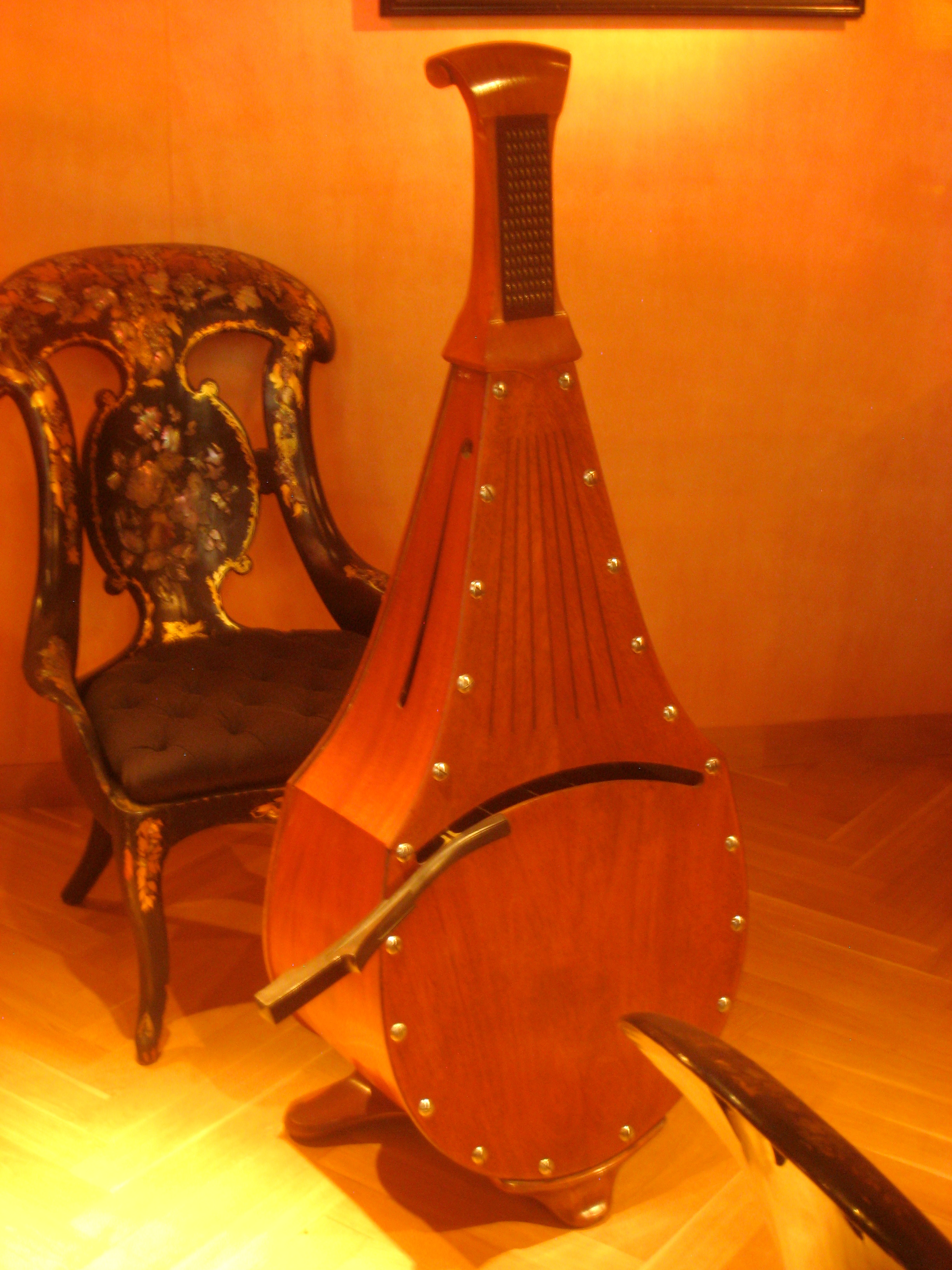
Cecilium in the Musical Instrument Museum, Brussels

Arthur Quentin de Gromard (1821–1896) was a French musician.

Gromard lived in Eu, Seine-Maritime, founded a philharmonic society (the Cécilienne) in 1857, and he was the inventor of a musical instrument, called the cecilium (1861). He spent 35 years on the design of this complex instrument, a cross between a harmonium and a cello. It is related to the concertina, bandoneon and the accordion. Only 310 originals were ever created. This instrument is on display in museums in Brussels, Milan and New York, the Schweizerisches Harmonium-Museum, Liestal and Ringve Museum, Trondheim, Norway. The instrument uses free reeds and, according to its inventor, could be used as a solo instrument, to provide accompaniment, or as a quartet. However, "its sound was not powerful enough to meet the demands of a regular orchestral instrument."

A peculiar free reed and keyboard instrument invented by Quantin de Crousard and exhibited in Paris in 1867. It was the shape and about the size of the violincello and was held in the same position. It had reeds acted upon by keys pressed by the left hand and supplied by wind from bellows worked by the right hand by means of a handle like a bow. The cecilium had a compass of about five octaves, and the tone was sweet and sonorous.

It was described in the Crosby Brown Collection:

A pear-shaped case of red wood with flat back and short neck, in which are 78 ivory touches arranged in 6 rows of 13 each. These touches operate a series of free reeds, which, with the bellows, are concealed within the case. Wind is supplied to the bellows by a handle working through an opening in the lower part of the front of the case.

== See also ==
- Mélophone
