= Ernest Rude =

Norwegian photographer

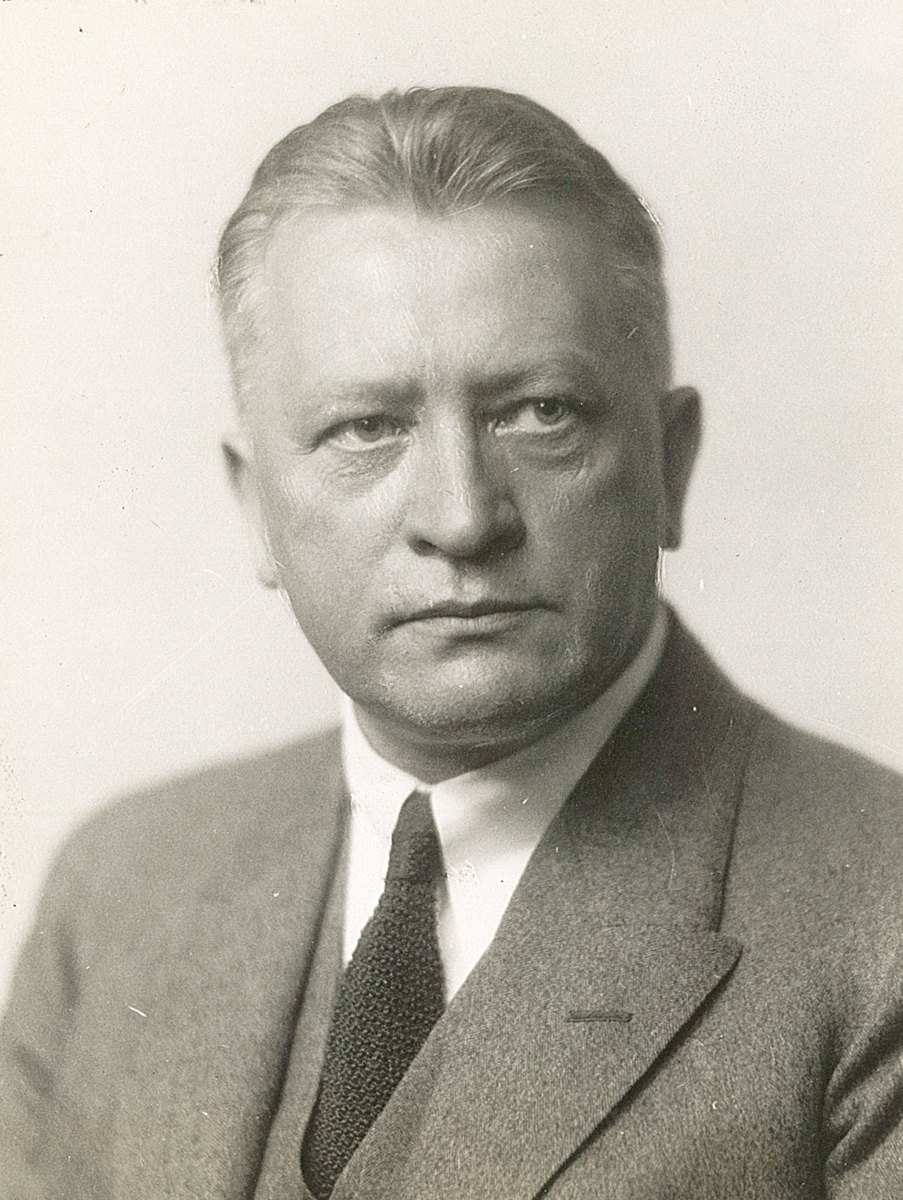
Ernest Rude, sometime in the 1930s

Ernest Rude (23 January 1871 – 18 March 1948) was a Norwegian photographer. He was born in Drammen as a son of photographer Christoffer Gade Rude (1839–1901) and his wife Andrea Elise Geelmuyden (1839–1920). He was an uncle of Finn Støren.

He started his career in his father's company, and from 1907 to 1910 he ran a company together with Frederik Hilfling-Rasmussen. He continued to run this company until his death in March 1948 in Oslo, from 1943 with Andreas Thorsrud who took it over. As a photographer Rude was best known for portrait photography. He chaired the Norwegian Association of Professional Photographers from 1912 to 1927 and became an honorary member in 1946. He was also an honorary member of the Swedish and Danish associations, and was appointed a Knight of the Order of the Dannebrog in 1925.

== Family ==
Rude was married to Margrete Arneberg (1876–1954), and their son Rolf Rude was a notable painter.
