= Finn Støren =

Norwegian businessperson and civil servant

Finn Sofus Støren (20 November 1893 – 18 April 1962) was a Norwegian businessperson and civil servant for Nasjonal Samling.

He was born in Kristiansand as a son of customs officer Petter Johan Nicolay Støren (1866–1924) and Elise Christopha Rude (1867–1926). He had a twin brother, was a nephew of Ernest Rude and his father was a cousin of Johan Nicolai Støren. The family moved to Kristiania when Finn was seven years old. He took his examen artium as a private candidate in 1914, and spent time in Belgium, the United States, Norway, Germany, Spain and Russia. He spent four years in Russia, and became an anti-Communist. He then lived for two years in Colombia and four years in Panama. In 1930 he became Norwegian consul in Panama. In April 1919 he had married Inger Lorange Suhrke, a daughter of architect and politician Wilhelm Christian Suhrke.

Støren moved back to Norway in 1933, settled in Drangedal Municipality, and joined the newly formed Fascist party Nasjonal Samling. He continued as a businessman until May 1940, one month after the start of the occupation of Norway by Nazi Germany. He then "offered his services" to Nasjonal Samling's leader Vidkun Quisling, and in September 1940 he was appointed as deputy under-secretary of state in the directorate Direktoratet for spesialorientering (from 1940 to 1942 named Direktoratet for utenriks orientering, from 1944 to 1945 named Kansliets utenriksavdeling). Serving until 1945, he has been called "Quisling's informal Minister of Foreign Affairs" (formally, Norway had none).

Støren was an acting leader of Nordmannsforbundet from 1941, and member of the supervisory council of the Bank of Norway from 1942. From 1944 he acted as an ambassador, accompanying Quisling on visits to Adolf Hitler. He probably had an influence on Quisling's views, but this has not been researched thoroughly. Together with Frederik Prytz he was also a driving force behind Norwegian land claims in Eastern Europe. It has also been written that Støren wrote books during the Second World War, under the pseudonyms Finn Balg and Finn Grong. This is not correct. They were written by Støren's childhood friend Håkon Meyer, but as Meyer was more of an outsider Støren claimed in "NS circles" that he wrote the books.

The German occupation ended on 8 May 1945, and Støren was arrested by Danish police in Copenhagen on 15 May. Extradited to Norway, he was imprisoned until 1947. He was released from prison, and was soon to be tried as a part of the legal purge in Norway after World War II; however he escaped on an Argentina-bound ship. He made it to Argentina despite having been arrested for a short while in Tangier. He lived as a businessman and died in Buenos Aires in April 1962. He was buried in Haslum, Norway.
