= Folehaveskoven =

Forest in Hørsholm, Denmark

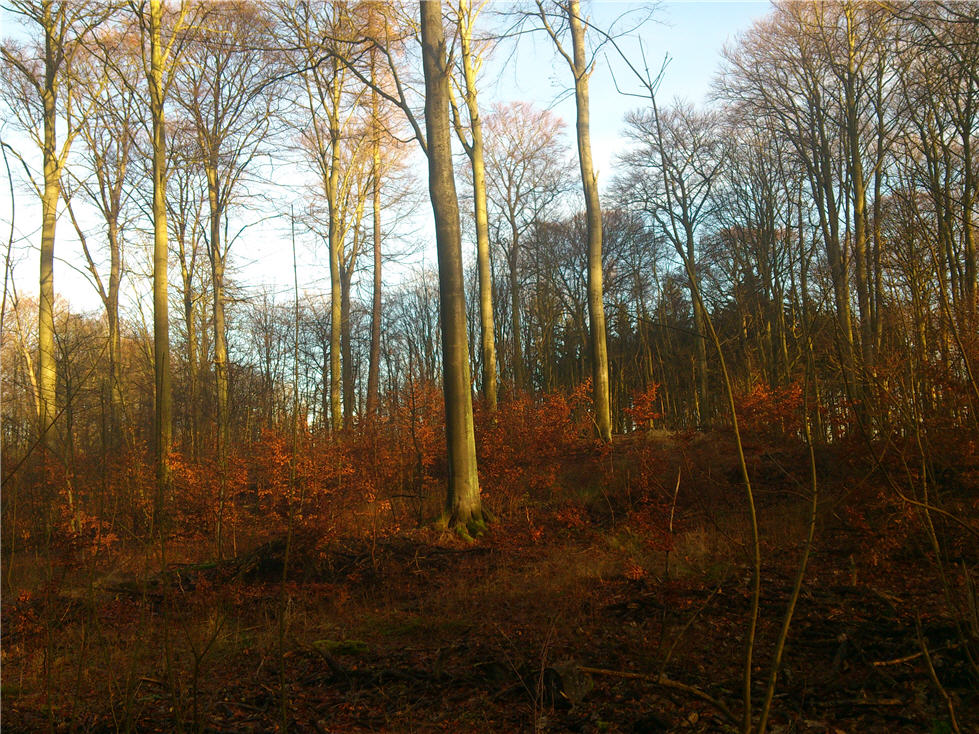
- Folkehaveskoven in winter
- Interactive map of Folehaveskoven

Geography
- Location: Hørsholm, Greater Copenhagen, Denmark
- Coordinates: 55°52′12″N 12°31′48″E
- Area: 3.61 km^{2} (1.39 sq mi)

Ecology
- Fauna: deer, fox, badger, raven, woodpecker, bats

Folehaveskoven, or Folehave Skov, is a forest in Hørsholm on the northern outskirts of Copenhagen, Denmark. It is part of a complex of smaller woodlands which also comprises Rungsted Hegn to the north, Deputatvang and Øster Sandbjerg to the south. It is bisected by the east–west running Folehavevej and is to the east bounded by the Coast Line.

== History ==
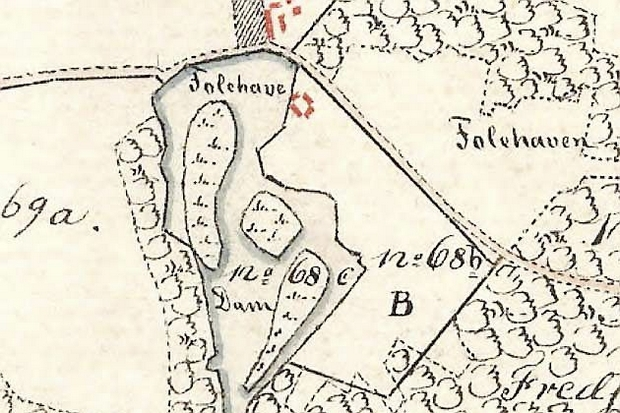
Map detail showing Folehaven in c. 1816

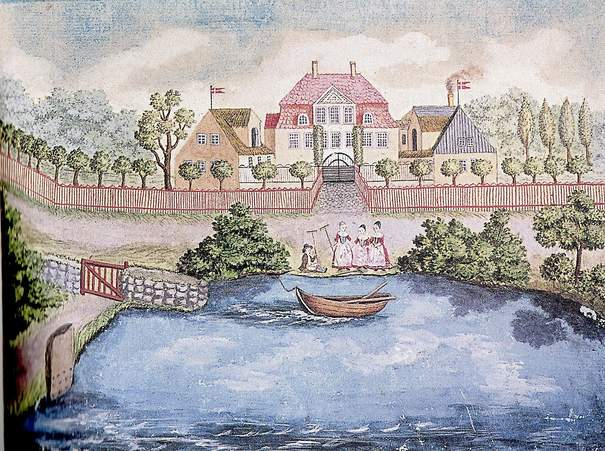
The King's Pond painted by Jean-Françoìs de Dompierre de Jonquières in c. 1999

The forest used to belong to Hirschholm Palace. The estate comprised some 60 fishing ponds which supplied the royal household with freshwater fish. One of them was Kongens Dam ("King's Pond") which according to records from 1751 could "take" 1,000 carps (karper) and 3,000 Crucian carps (karusser). The pond was drained in the 1780s.

== Ecology ==
Golehaven consists mainly of Beech trees. The forest covers an undulating terrain with many boggy depressions. Friese's Meadow in the northeastern section was recreated in 1995. Researchers from Hørsholm Arboretum has experimented with planting of different trees in some areas.

The Danish Nature Agency has worked with Environmental restoration in Folehaveskoven since the 1990s. The King's Pond was recreated in 2014. It has a water surface of approximately 15,000 square metres and is two to three metres deep. The lake is located next to Folehavevej and Folehavegård. It contains a small island.

== Landmarks ==
=== Linstow's grave ===
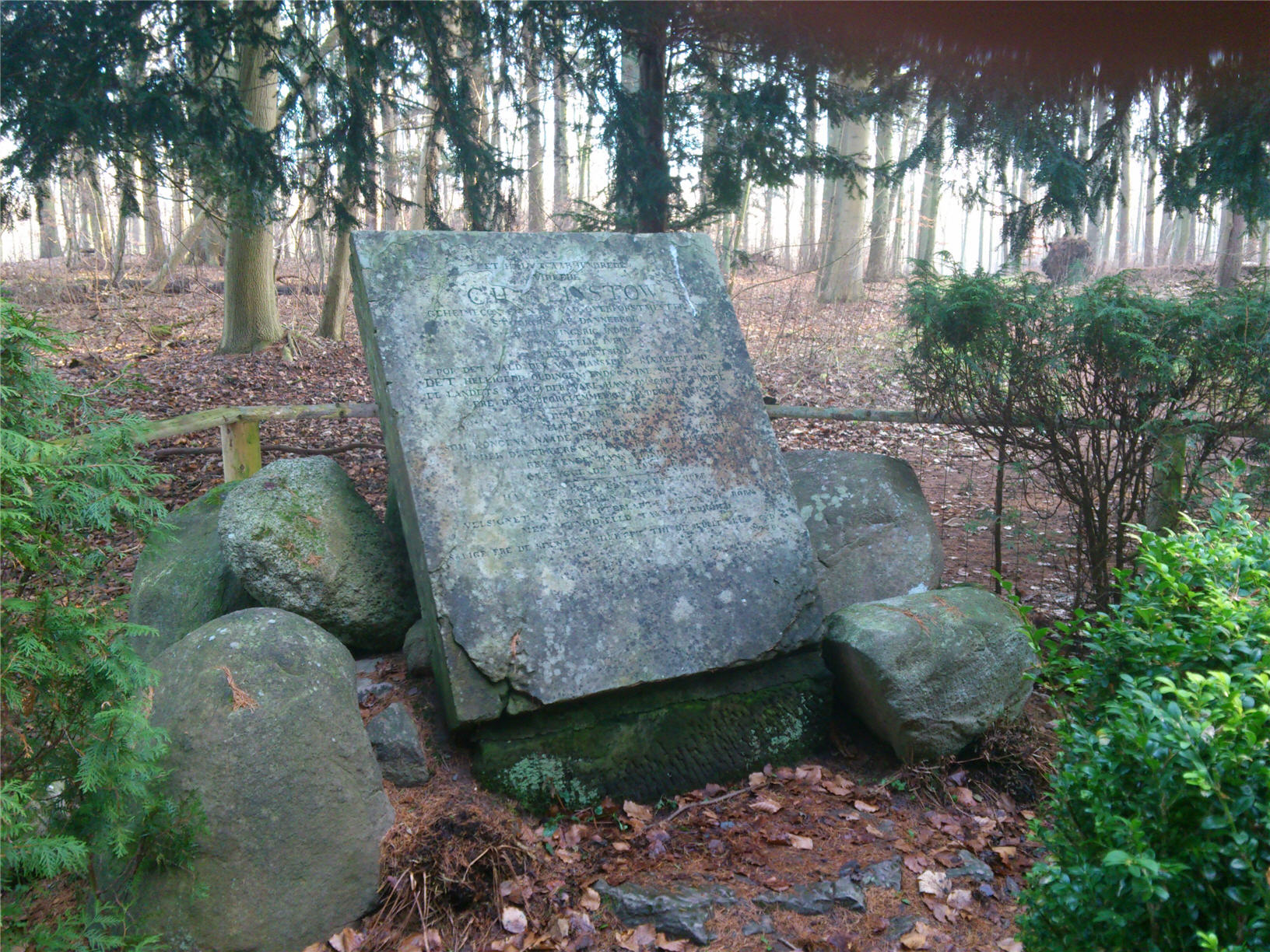
Christoph Hartwig von Linstow's grave

Folehaveskoven is the site of Christoph Hartwig von Linstow's grave. He had become Danish chief forester on (5 April) 1784, a position he held until his death on 12 April 1823. Together with G. W. Brüel og C. A. C. Claussen, he was responsible for carrying out great improvements to the management of the Danish state forests.

=== Prehistoric sites ===
Folehaveskoven contains some 60 prehistoric monuments. Most are well-preserved burial mounds from the Bronze Age (c. 1000 BC). These mounds are located in small groups in a two kilometre wide band along the coast. The forest also features a number of dolmens from the earliest Stone Age, some 5000 years ago, the largest of which is 42 metres long. There are also a few stone mounds dating from the Iron Age. The most notable monuments in the forest are signposted.

== Recreational use ==
A 3.5 km walk is marked with yellow dots on the trees. Hørsholm Equestrian Centre is located on Folehavevej in direct association with the forest and it is therefore also popular with riders.

== See also ==
- Hørsholm Riding Club
