= Frederik Hilfling-Rasmussen =

Norwegian photographer

Jens Carl Frederik Hilfling-Rasmussen (14 October 1869 – 23 February 1941) was a Danish-born Norwegian photographer.

He was born in Brenderup, Denmark as a son of photographer Jens Rasmussen. He grew up in Assens, where he learned photography in his father's company. He worked in Copenhagen from 1890 to 1896, and then migrated to Kristiania. He started his own photo studio in 1898, and by 1905 he was preferred as the official photographer of many events. From 1907 to 1910 Hilfling-Rasmussen had a company together with Ernest Rude, and Hilfling-Rasmussen then moved to Trondhjem. As a photographer he was best known for portrait photography. He taught at the school Trondhjems Fagskole, was a board member of the Norwegian Association of Professional Photographers from 1913, and became an honorary member in 1937. He died in February 1941 in Trondheim, and his son Skjold Hilfling-Rasmussen took over the company.
