= Brenderup Folk High School =

Coordinates: 55.4910°N 9.9727°E

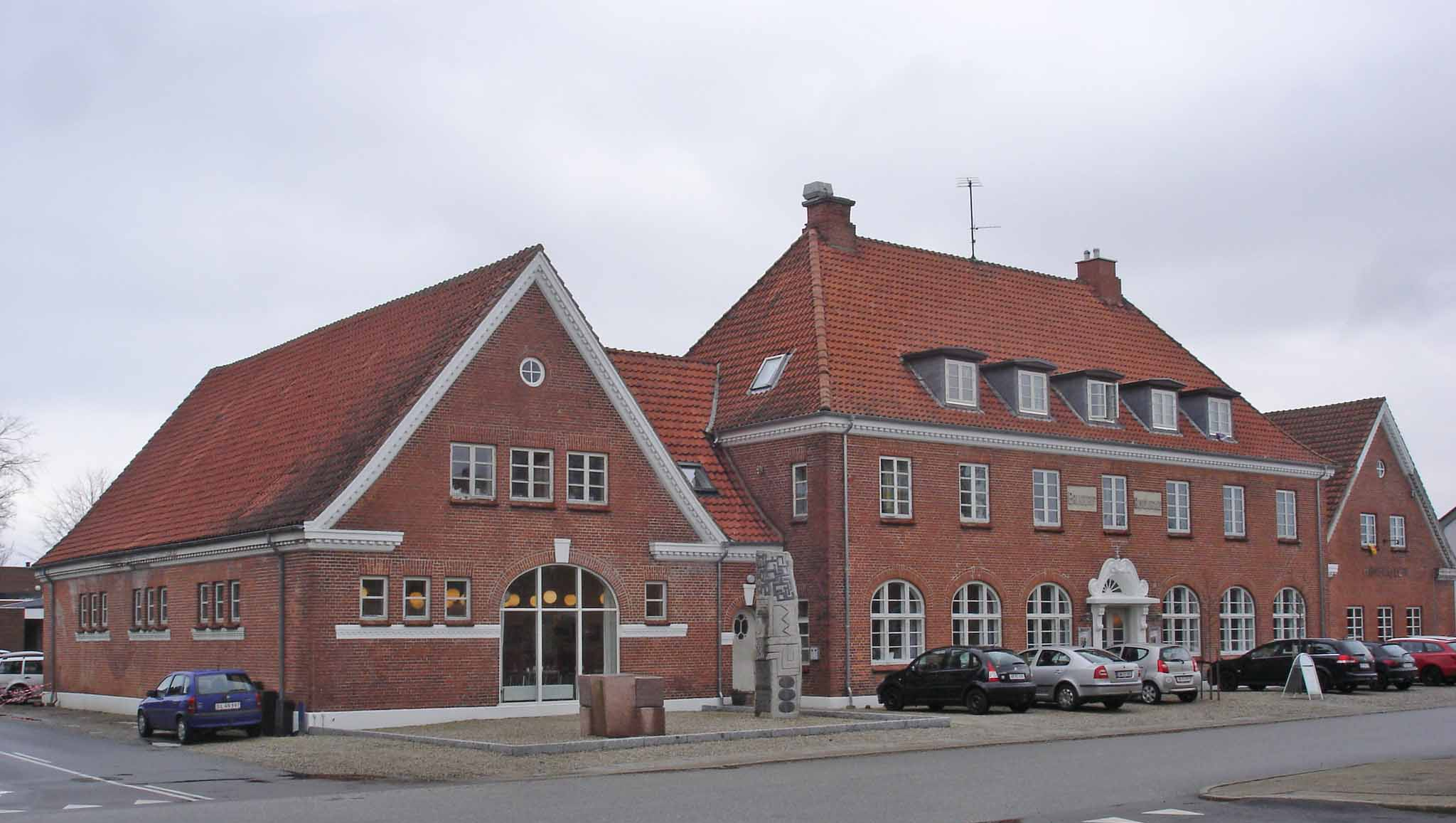
- Brenderup; Region of Southern Denmark

Information
- Established: 1986

Brenderup Folk High School is a small Danish folk high school in Brenderup, a village of Brenderup Sogn in Middelfart Municipality, Region of Southern Denmark. The school was founded in 1986, as a part of what was then known as the international peace movement. Today the school is focused mainly on sustainability.
