= Folehavegård =

Farmhouse in Hørsholm, Denmark

Coordinates: 55.8714°N 12.5217°E

Folehavegård is an 18th-century farmhouse in Hørsholm, Denmark. It has been owned by Karen Blixen's father Wilhelm Dinesen, as well as her younger sister Ellen Dahl (née Dinesen), and was owned by the family for more than a hundred years. The main building, barn and stable are listed. Much of the land has been sold off. The remaining 35 hectares consist mostly of open farmland but adjoins the woodlands Folehaveskoven and Rungsted Hegn.

== History ==
=== 18th century ===
The property was originally a farm under Hørsholm Manor- Om 1759. Stolberg arranged for much of the land to be sold at auction to improve the economy of the queen's palace. Lot No. 5 (now Folehavegård) was acquired by the naval officer Conrad von Schindel. He had been stationed in the Mediterranean as commander of the frigate Dokken in 1761–63 where he negotiated a trade treaty with Tunesia. Schindel initially named the estate Christinegaard but renamed it Folehavegård after a major rebuilding of the house. He owned it until 1788.

In December 1786, Folehavegård was acquired by nacal lieutenant Ulrich Lodberg. After three years, he sold it to former director of the Danish Asiatic Company Hohan Leonhard Fix. In 1791, Golehavegård changed hands again when Fix sold it for 13,000 Danish rigsdaler to Jacob Brønnum Scavenius. Already the following year, he bought the much larger estate Ghorslsev in Stevns, which may have contributed to his decision to dispose of the property in North Zealand. In any case, he sold Golehavegård in 1794. The new owner was Claes Fredric Horn, one of the masterminds behind the assassination of Gustav III, who now used the name Frederik Classon.

=== 1900–1879 ===
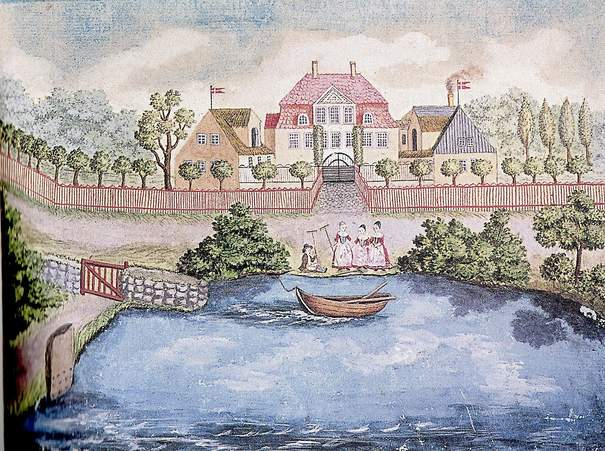
The King's Pond painted by Jean-Françoìs de Dompierre de Jonquières in c. 1800.

In September 1798, Classon sold Folehavegård for 12, 000 rigsdaler to Paulin-Philippe-Henri de Dompierre de Jonquils. Jonquières belonged to Vopenhagen's reformed congregation. He was the brother-in-law of Frédéric de Coninck.

=== Dinesen family ===
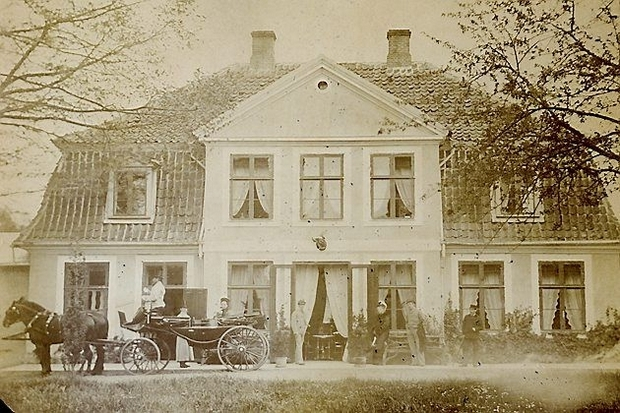
Folehavegård in 1885

Wilhelm Dinesen, Karen Blixen's father, acquired Folehavegård in 1879. He renovated the buildings and introduced various improvements. Dinesen was also the owner of Rungstedlund and Rungstedgård.

Mary Bess Westenholz, a sister of Karen Blixen's mother, lived at Folehavegård from 1881 until her death in 1947. In 1909, she stormed the Danish Rigsdagen and gave a speech to the all-male politicians.

In 1920, Hørsholm Municipality purchased a large portion of land from Folehavegård and used to redevelop it with new housing. In 1944, Hørsholm acquired additional land, this time just under 20 hectares, which was also redeveloped.

== The grounds ==
The estate covers approximately 35 hectares. It consists mostly of open farmland but a marshland, Slettemose, is located in its northern part. The estate was subject to a voluntary but binding conservation in 1944.

== List of owners ==
- (1759-1786) Conrad von Schindel
- (1786-1789) Ulrich Lodberg
- (1789-1791) Johan Leonhard Fix
- (1791-1794) Jacob Brønnum Scavenius
- (1794-1798) Frederik Claesson
- (1798-1821) Paulin-Philippe-Henri de Dompierre de Jonquières
- (1821-1824) A. Christian Christensen
- (1824-1834) Johan Frederik Vilhelm Vally
- (1834-1851) Gottlieb Frederik von Wildenradt
- (1851-1866) Aron Nathan David
- (1866-1869) Harald David
- (1869-1871) Frederik Horsens Block
- (1871-1879) Carl Christian Brøchner
- (1879-1895) Wilhelm Dinesen
- (1895-1932) Ingeborg Dinesen
- (1932-1958) Ellen Dahl née Dinesen
- (1958-2000) Anne Kopp née Dinesen
- (2000-2010) Anders Kopp / Henrik Kopp / Niels Kopp
- (2010-) Mikael Lunøe / Lotte Bønnelycke

== See also ==
- Listed buildings in Hørsholm Municipality
