= Johan Leonhard Fix =

German-Danish merchant

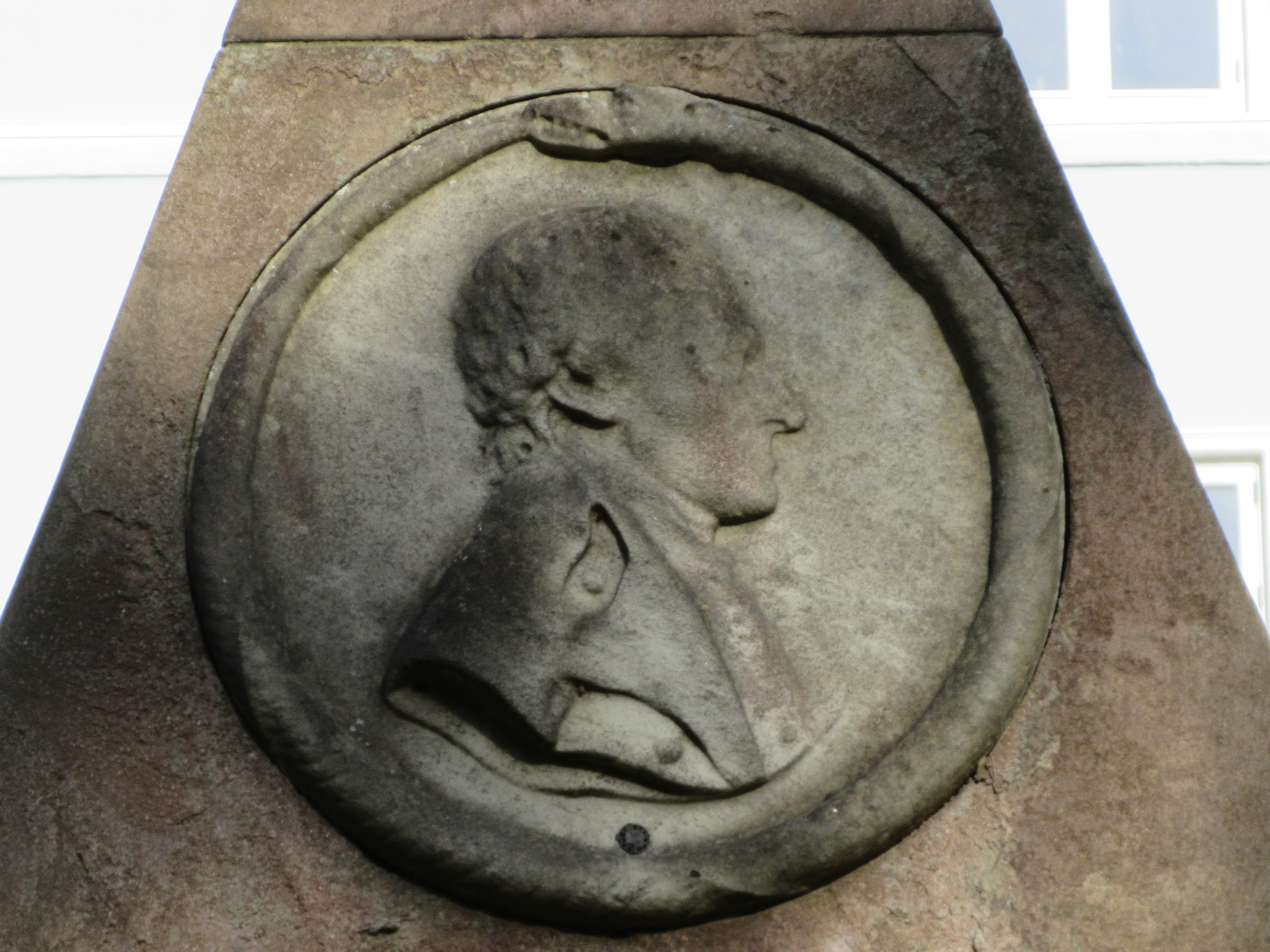
- A relief of Fix seen on his grave at Assistens Cemetery in Copenhagen
- Born: 28 December 1735; Hanau, Germany
- Died: 2 February 1807 (aged 71); Copenhagen, Denmark
- Resting place: Assistens Cemetery, Copenhagen
- Occupations: Merchant and ship-owner

Johan Leonhard Fix (28 December 1735 - 2 February 1807) was a German-Danish merchant who served as Governor of Frederiknagore in Danish India. He moved to Copenhagen in 1787 where he served as director of the Danish Asiatic Company from 1791 to 1805. He was the third largest contributor to the rebuilding of Christiansborg Palace after the first Christiansborg Palace was destroyed in a fire in 1804.

== Early life ==
Fix was born on 28 December 1735 in Hanau near Frankfurt. His father was a weaver. The family belonged to the Dutch Reformed church.

== Years in India ==
Fix travelled to Copenhagen on foot where he was employed as bookkeeper by the Danish Asiatic Company in 1867 and travelled to Trankebar and the Bengal on board the ship CRON PRINCEN AF DANEMARK.

Hermann Abbestée wrote an angry letter about Fix's conduct in 1770.

In 1771 he married Anthonetta Maria Henckel in Frederiksnagore. She was the widow of Hermann Fredericks Henckel, a Danish Asiatic Company merchant and former Oberhoved of Frederiksnagore.

In 1776, he was fired from the Danish Asiatic Company. Then, in a partnership with John Fenwick, he ran a private trading house with a fleet of up to five ships. The partnership ended in court after disagreements. In 1783, he partnered with Melchoir La Beaume, a Frenchman based in Tranquebar. The partnership ended in court after disagreements.

== Late life in Denmark ==
- In 1787, Fix returned to Copenhagen. In 1789 he purchased the property at Amaliegade 13. He also owned Folehavegård at Hørsholm from 1789 to 1791.
- In 1791 he was elected Director of the Danish Asiatic Company. He kept the post until 1805.
- In 1794, he made a 2000 Danish rigsdaler donation for the rebuilding of Christiansborg Palace.
- In 1798, he was involved in a court case with Duntzfelt about a disagreement about taxation due to origin of a set of Nanjing textiles.
- He died on 2 February 1807 and is buried at Assistens Cemetery.
