= Brenderup =

- Town
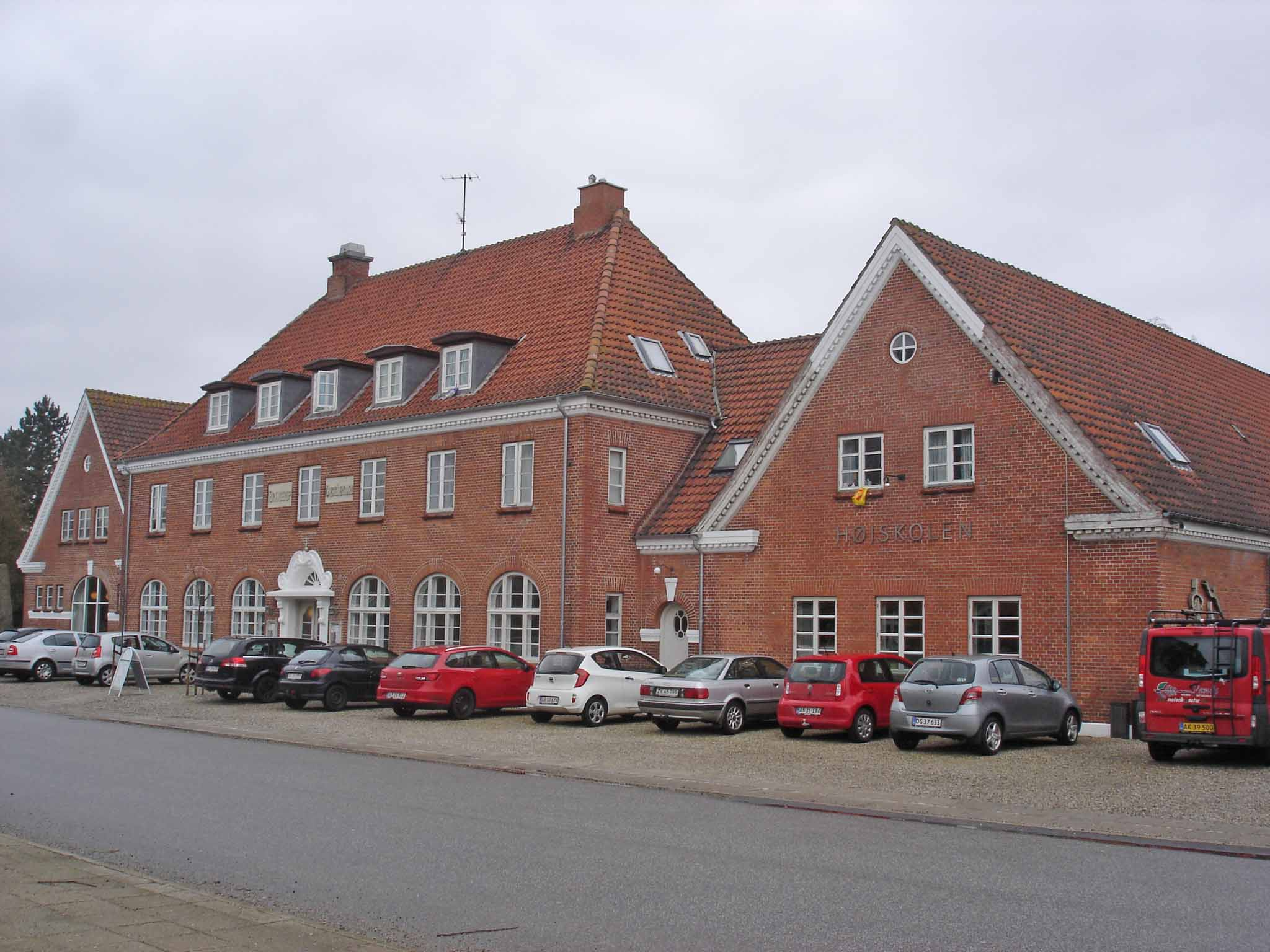
- Brenderup High School

- Location in the Region of Southern Denmark
- Coordinates: 55°29′1″N 9°58′51″E
- Country: Denmark
- Region: Southern Denmark
- Municipality: Middelfart

Area
  - Urban: 1.6 km^{2} (0.62 sq mi)

Population (2026)
  - Urban: 1,481
  - Urban density: 930/km^{2} (2,400/sq mi)
- Time zone: UTC+1 (CET)
  - Summer (DST): UTC+2 (CEST)

Brenderup is a town, with a population of 1,481 (1 January 2026), situated on the island of Funen in Middelfart Municipality, Region of Southern Denmark in Denmark.

Brenderup is located 14 km southwest of Bogense, 31 km northwest of Odense and 16 km east of Middelfart.

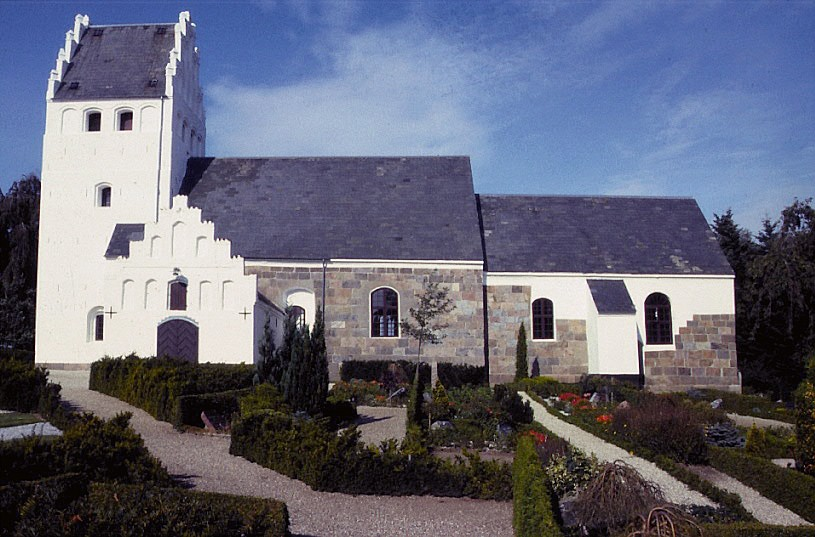
Brenderup Church

Brenderup Church is located to the south in the old part of the town.

== Notable people ==
- Frederik Hilfling-Rasmussen (1869 in Brenderup – 1941), a Danish-born Norwegian photographer.
