= Victoria Bachke =

Russian-Norwegian musician (1896–1963)

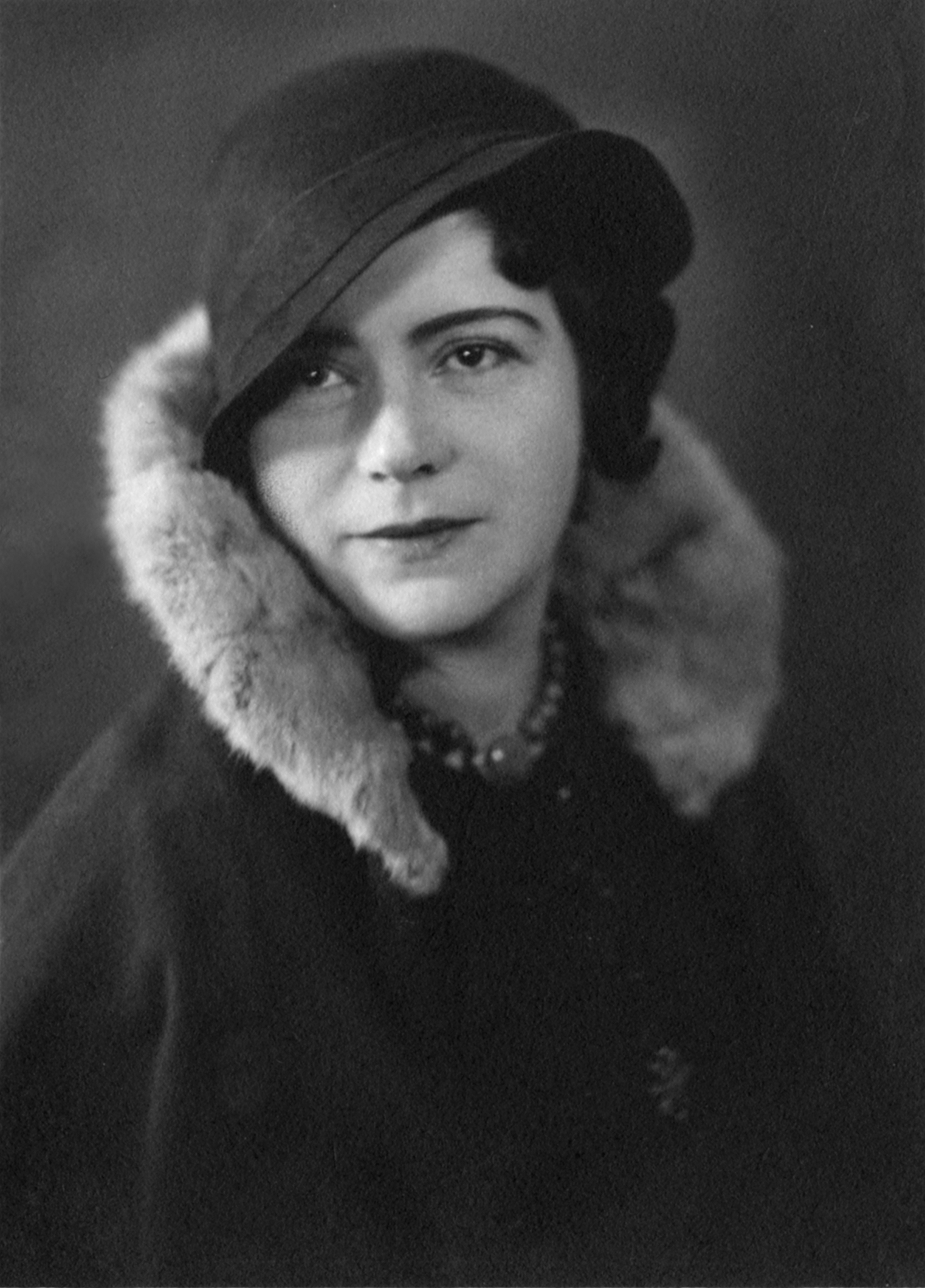
Victoria Bachke

Victoria Bachke (7 July 1896 – 19 November 1963) was a Russian-born Norwegian musician and museum director. She is most widely known as the founder and first director of Ringve Museum, the national museum of music and musical instruments at Lade, Trondheim, Norway.

== Biography ==
Victoria Rostin was born in Moscow in the Russian Empire. She was the daughter of Michael Rostin and Sophie Rostin. Michael was a senior engineer with the Russian state railways. She and her eight brothers and sisters grew up in a cultured environment. Music and singing was important for the family. Victoria played both cello and piano.

In March 1914, Victoria and her elder sister Valentine Rostin (1887-1940) toured Europe. Valentine was an opera singer, and performed a lot of concerts all over Europe. They entered Trondheim at 1917. Valentine Rostin became the new prima donna at Trondheim's theater after the role of Violetta in the play La Traviata. Valentine married the conductor Morten Svendsen (1878-1959).

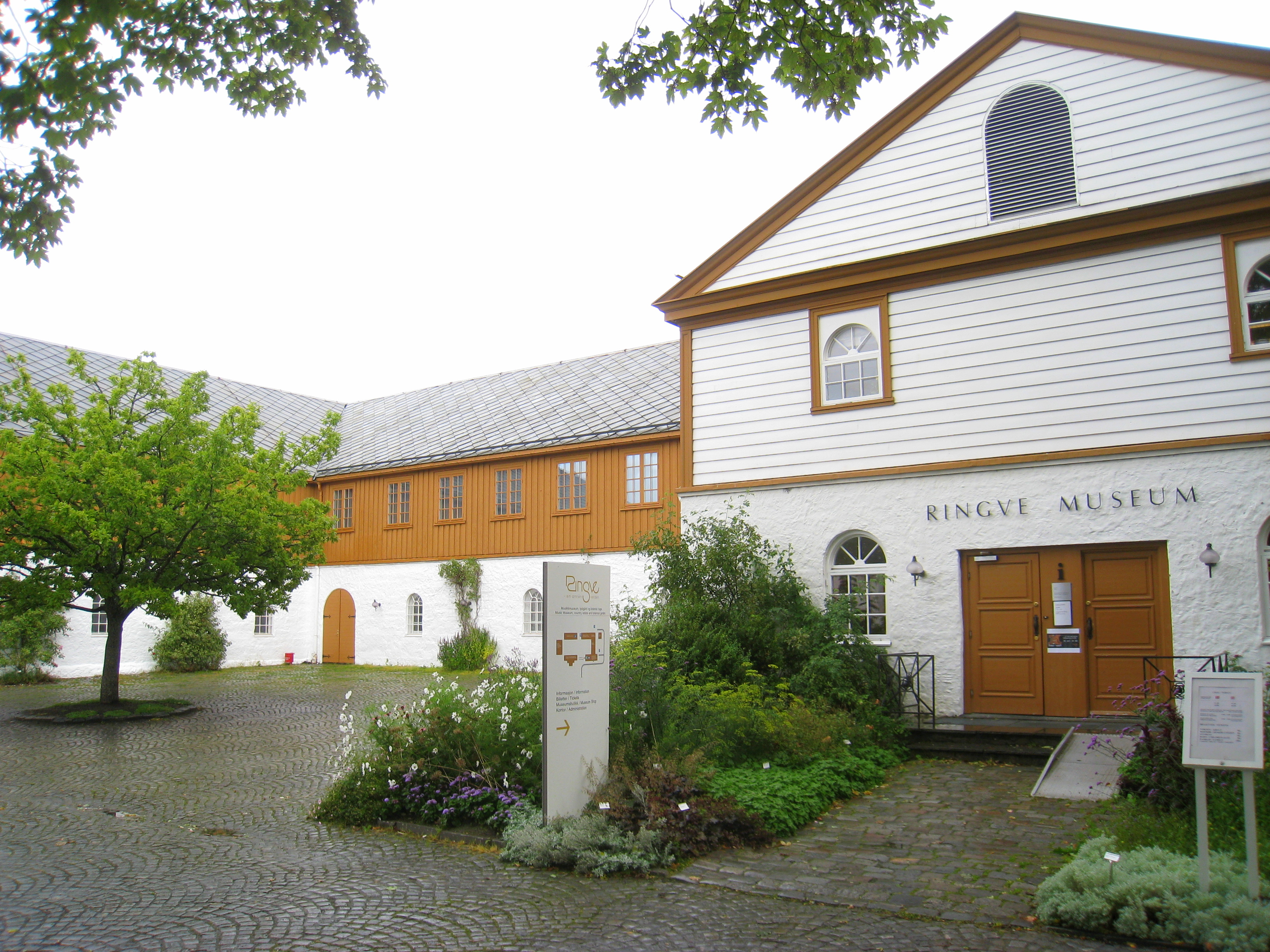
Ringve Museum

== Ringve Museum ==
In 1920 Victoria married businessman and estate owner Christian Anker Bachke (1873-1946), son of Anton Sophus Bachke (1836-1919) owner of Ringve Manor. The couple lived at Ringve Manor and assembled a large collection of historical musical instruments. In 1943 Ringve Manor was willed to the Ringve Museum foundation. Ringve Museum (Ringve Musikkmuseum) is situated in the former Ringve Manor and was opened to the public in 1952. The museum principally displays the former private collection of Christian and Victoria Bachke.

== Other sources ==
- Voigt, Jan (1984) Fru Victoria til Ringve (Oslo: Cappelen)
- Dugstad, Jorunn (2017) Victoria med vilje og kjærlighet (Communicatio forl.) ISBN 9788283240085

Cultural offices
Preceded by position created	Director of Ringve Museum; 1952–1963	Succeeded by Jan Voigt
