= Johan Henrich Berlin =

Norwegian composer and organist

Johan Henrich Berlin (1741 – 1807, Trondhjem) was a Norwegian composer and organist.

He was born in Trondheim, Norway to a German father, Johan Daniel Berlin (1714 – 1787), who was a successful musician. At the age of seventeen, he was appointed organist at the Hospital Church; and, from 1772, he served as organist of the Church of Our Lady. He became organist of the Cathedral in 1787, a post he inherited from his father.

His extant works include two symphonies, a cantata, and piano music.
