= August Konow =

Norwegian businessman and politician

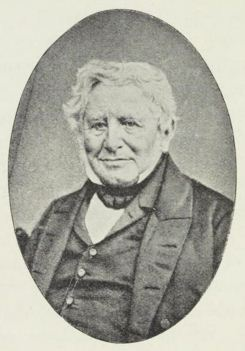
- August Konow
- Born: 19 October 1780; Bergen, Norway
- Died: 9 April 1873 (aged 92); Copenhagen, Denmark
- Occupation: Businessman
- Awards: Order of Vasa

August Konow (19 October 1780 – 9 April 1873) was a Norwegian businessman and politician from Bergen.

== Early life ==
Konow was born in Bergen, Norway. He was one of thirteen children of Friedrich Ludwig Konow (1746–98) and Anna Hedvig Rieck (1756–1810). He was the brother of merchant Wollert Konow (1779–1839) and naval officer Thomas Konow (1796–1881). He received a trade education together with his brother Wollert at Johan Köhns Institute in Hamburg (1792–94). His father had immigrated from Schwerin in Mecklenburg during 1769 and established an import-export business.

== Career in Norway ==
Following the death of his father in 1798, his merchant business went bankrupt. Krohn and his brother Wollert subsequently started the company Konow & Co., which was engaged in fish exports and grain imports. Konow was an alternate member of the Storting 1815–16, 1818 and 1821 and permanent representative in 1824. His brother Wollert died in 1839 after which August continued the company, under the name of Aug. Konow & Sønner.

== Late life in Denmark ==
Konow moved to Denmark in 1861. He shared his time between his townhouse at Amaliegade 13 in Copenhagen and his country house Villa Konow in Springforbi on the coast to the north of the city. His son Hans Konow followed him to Copenhagen.
