= Jean-Françoìs de Dompierre de Jonquières =

Dutch painter

Jean-Françoìs de Dompierre de Jonquières or (27 November 1775 - 27 May 1820) was a Dutch-Danish merchant of French descent, landowner and amateur artist. He is remembered for his drawings and watercolours of landscapes from North Zealand.

== Biography ==
Jean-Françoìs de Dompierre de Jonquières was born on 27 November 1775 in The Hague, the son of the counselor Paulinus Philippus Henricus de Dompierre de Joncquières (13 August 1744 – 12 May 1822) and Cecile de Coninck (4 November 1748 – 12 June 1819). Ancestors of his father had fled from France to Holland after the Revocation of the Edict of Nantes in 1685. He achieved a doctoral degree in law from the Leiden University. The family moved to Denmark during the Napoleonic Wars. His father purchased Folehavegård at Hørsholm in 1798.

Dompierre de Jonquières worked as a merchant. He died unmarried and without children in 1820.

== Gallery ==
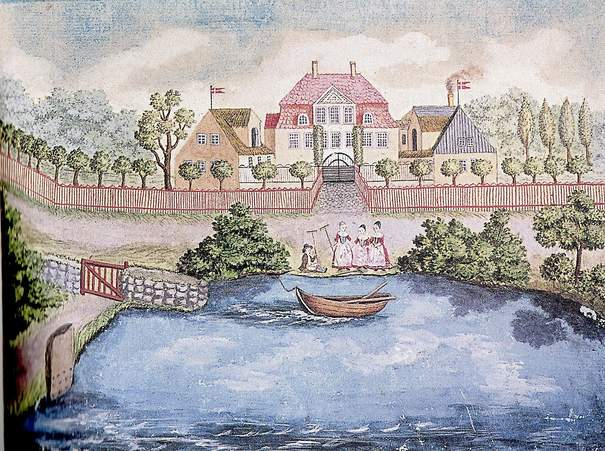
Folehavegård

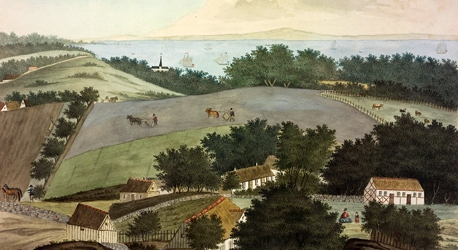
Vallerød
