= Caspar Kauffeldt =

Caspar Henrik Berntsen Kauffeldt (19 February 1773 – 19 August 1843) was a Norwegian industrialist. He was the founder of Gjøvig Glassverk.

Kauffeldt was born in Gjøvik in Oppland county, Norway. In 1804 he bought a farm in Gjøvig, which was at the time a rural area by the Hunnselva river. In 1807 he founded the glass factory Gjøvig Glassverk on the other side of the river, creating an industrial environment and laying the grounds for a larger city there. The factory became known for its blue vases, basing the color on cobalt blue from Blaafarveverket at Åmot in Modum.

In the 1830s, his son Wexel Hansen Kauffeldt (1801–1860) took over most of the factory administration. The operation became increasingly difficult with increasing competition from abroad. It was discontinued in 1843, and Caspar Kauffeldt died in the same year. Nearby to the factory, Kauffeldt had also erected the administration building "Kauffeldtgården". The building still stands today, and was preserved in 1985.
