= Wollert Konow (merchant) =

Norwegian merchant and politician

Wollert Konow (8 November 1779 – 3 October 1839) was a Norwegian merchant, politician and vice consul.

Konow was born in Bergen, Norway. He was the son of the Friedrich Ludwig Konow (1746–98) and his wife Anna Hedvig Rieck (1756–1810). He was the brother of merchant August Konow (1780–1873) and naval officer Thomas Konow (1796–1881). His father had immigrated from Schwerin in Mecklenburg during 1769. Wollert Konow and his brother trained at Johan Köhns Institute in Hamburg prior to working in their father's export business.

Following the death of his father in 1798, his merchant business went bankrupt. Wollert Krohn and his brother August subsequently started the company Konow & Co., which was engaged in fish exports and grain imports. The company became successful and later developed major shipping interests and extensive banking operations. By 1809, the company had agreed to establish the first insurance company in Bergen and provided funds for the establishment of a university. From 1815, he served as the Danish Vice-Consul. Konow was Bergen's representative to the Norwegian Parliament 1815–16 and 1827–28.
