= Wilhelm Christian Suhrke =

Norwegian architect and politician

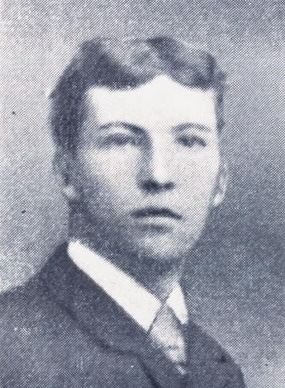
Wilhelm Christian Suhrke

Wilhelm Christian Suhrke (2 November 1863 – 10 May 1950) was a Norwegian architect and politician for the Conservative Party.

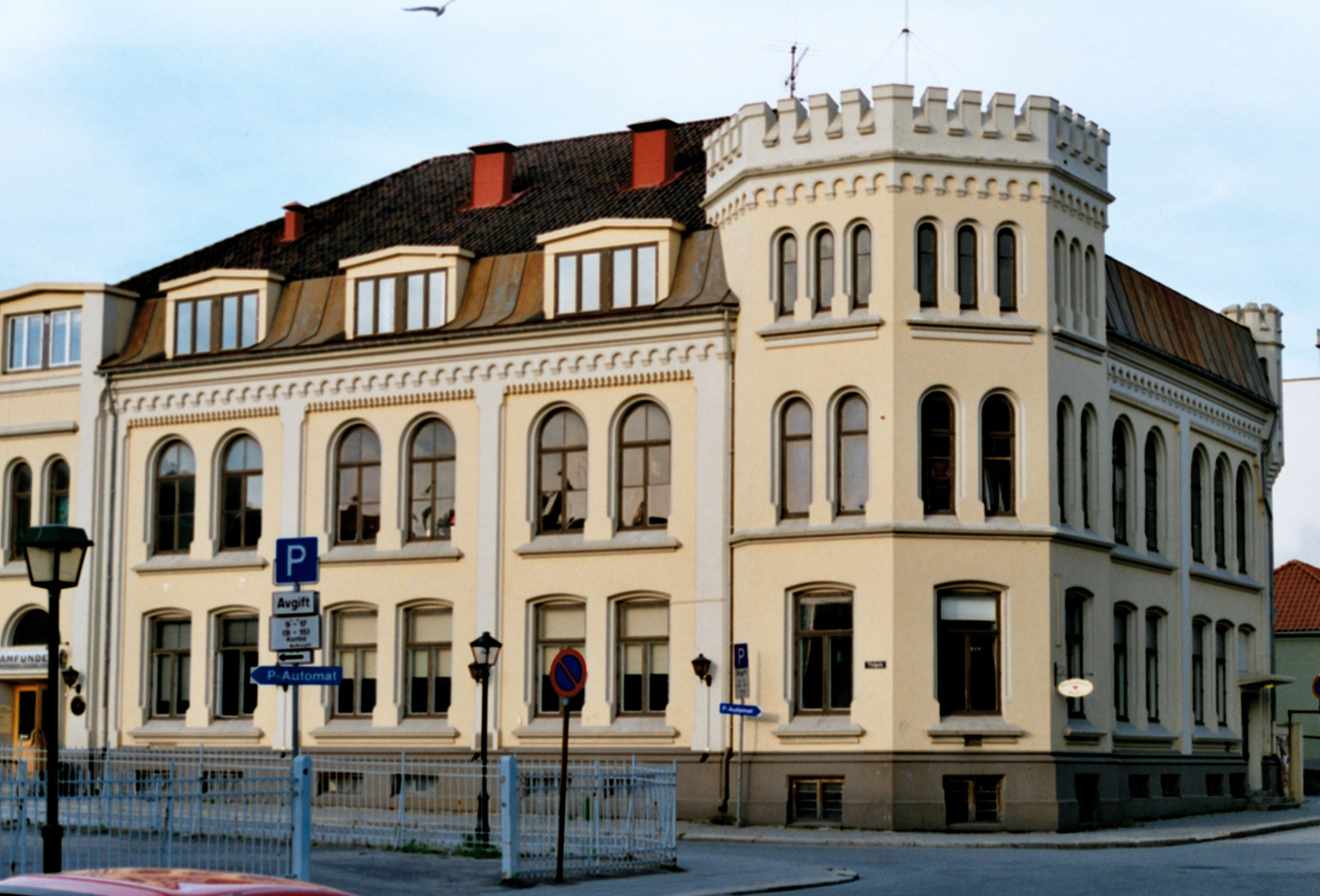
Tordenskjolds 3 in Halden

== Biography ==
He was born in Fredrikshald (now Halden) in Østfold, Norway. He was a son of German-born architect Ernst Suhrke (1829-1892) and his wife Barthe Svendsen (1837-1923). Suhrke graduated in engineering during 1882 from Trondhjems Tekniske Læreanstalt (now Norwegian University of Science and Technology) at Trondheim and studied at the Polytechnical School of Hannover (now Leibniz University Hannover) from 1884 to 1886. He joined his father in 1884 and from 1892 he directed the firm. He is known for designing buildings such as Halden Arbeidersamfund, Tordenskjolds 3, Halden Bad and his own residence Suhrkevillaen on Rødsberget in Halden. His later works are characterized by functionalism.

Suhrke served as vice consul for Germany from 1901. He was elected to Fredrikshald city council in 1892, and served for many years, including an unknown period as deputy mayor. He served as a member of the Parliament of Norway from 1904 to 1906 and 1910 to 1912.

Together with Ursula Lorange (1867–1933) he had two daughters. Inger Lorange Suhrke (1898-1982) who married diplomat Finn Støren. Else Lorange Suhrke (1902-1960) married Kaare Heiberg (1896-1978), son of railway director Eivind Heiberg.
