= Ringve Museum =

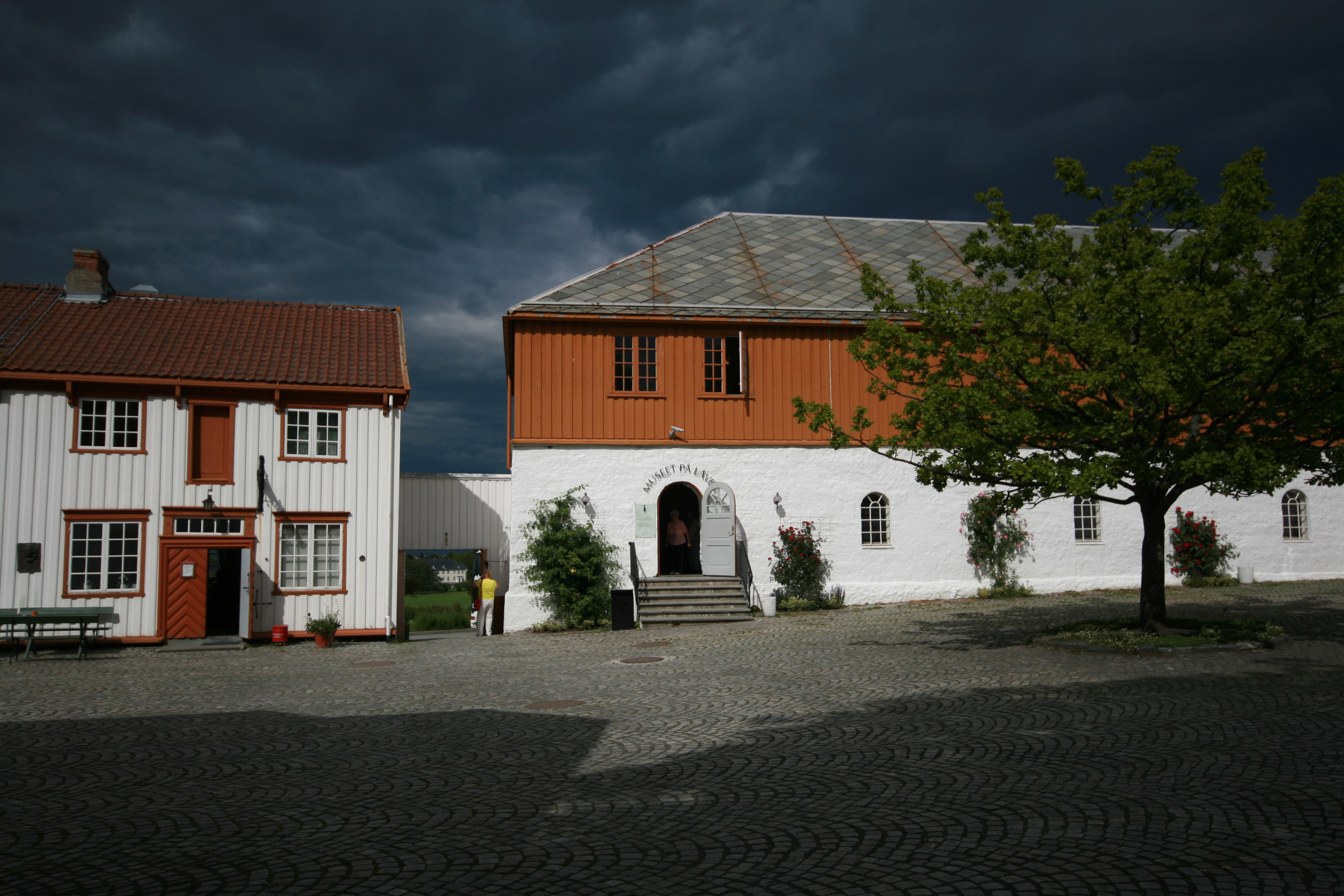
- Ringve, Norway's National museum of music and musical instruments.
- Established: 1952
- Location: Lade, Trondheim, Norway
- Coordinates: 63.447363°N 10.455208°E
- Type: Music museum, music history and instruments.
- Director: Ivar Roger Hansen

Ringve Museum is Norway's national museum for music and musical instruments, with collections from all over the world.

== Background ==
Ringve Museum is located in the historic Ringve Farm in Trondheim. Ringve Farm was the childhood home of the Danish-Norwegian nobleman, Peter Tordenskjold. It is situated in a park on the Lade peninsula just outside Trondheim with a view over the Trondheimsfjord, the park forming botanical gardens run by NTNU (the Norwegian University of Science and Technology). The first house on the site was built in 1521, but the current group of buildings dates from the 1740s onwards.

When the estate was auctioned in 1878, it was purchased by the Bachke family and one of the sons, Christian Anker Bachke (1873–1946) acquired the estate in 1919. In late 1919, he married Russian émigré Victoria Rostin Bachke, an artist who fled from the Russian Revolution. The couple had no children but put their considerable energies into their love of music and assembling a collection of historical musical instruments, which now numbers around 1,500 instruments, alongside other artifacts associated with music – pictures, recordings.

The museum is based on the private collection of founder Victoria Bachke and was opened to the public in 1952. Jon Voigt (1928–1997) succeeded Victoria Bachke as director in 1963 and continued until 1997. Over the years many famous musicians visited Ringve, including Artur Schnabel, Lilly Krauss, Ignaz Friedman, Percy Grainger and Kirsten Flagstad, as well as the artist, Edvard Munch.

== Exhibition ==
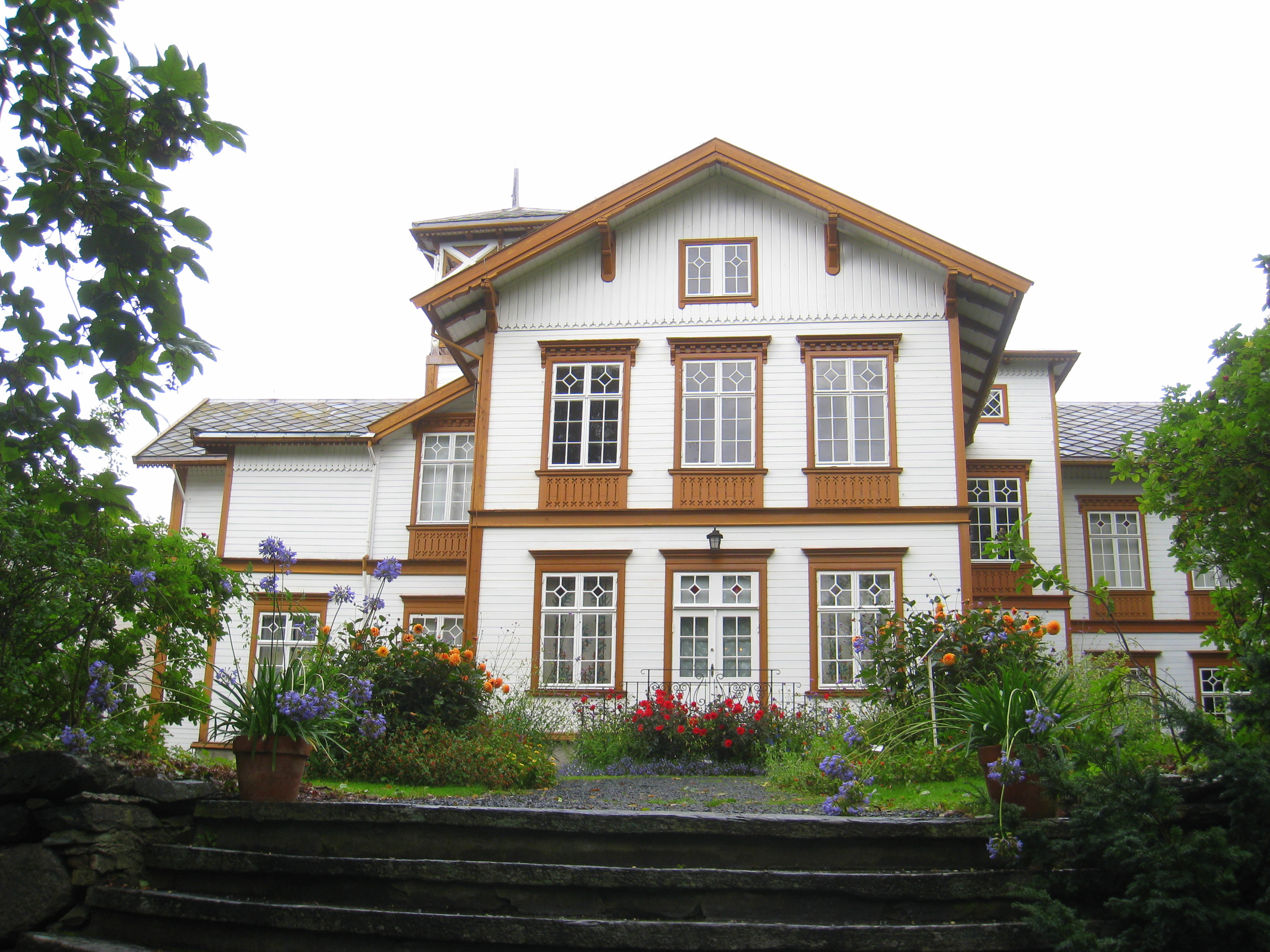
Ringve Museum manor house

The public exhibitions are divided in two parts: the Manor House and the Barn.

=== The Manor House ===
The period interiors of the Ringve Manor House provide the setting for themed rooms of working – mainly keyboard – instruments. In this section, open by guided tour only, the guides (often graduate music students) play an appropriate piece of music (or extract) as the tour proceeds.

The first room is called the Mozart room and contains a spinet, clavichord and a domestic or house organ, from the 18th century. A Murano glass chandelier hangs from the ceiling.

The next room is called the ‘Beethoven’ and contains a harp piano of 1870 by Dietz, and a piano of type favoured by Beethoven. A room dedicated to Chopin comes next, with examples of the composer's preferred pianos, as well as a death mask and casts of his hands. There are also watercolours by George Sand and memorabilia about Chopin and Liszt. A card table and sofa that came from Chopin's Paris home, and which were inherited by his Norwegian pupil Thomas Tellefsen are on display.

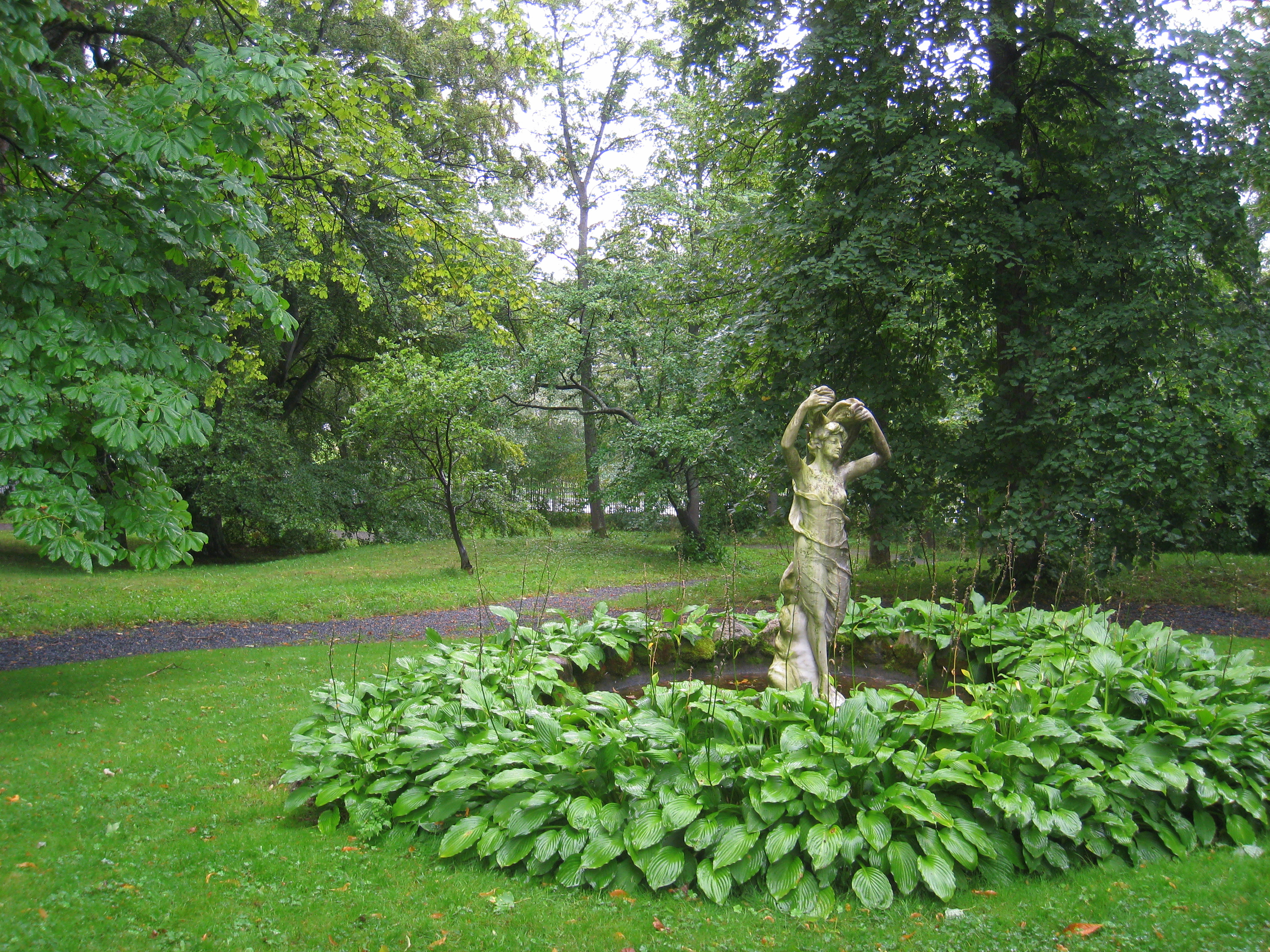
Park in the English style

Upstairs there is a room based around singers Elisabeth Wiborg and Adelina Patti and includes a piano which Patti insisted on being accompanied. This is followed by a display of Hardanger fiddles, a ‘Grieg’ room, a room of instruments associated with church and worship, and finally a room of curiosities, including a Cecilium, a Norwegian-made barrel-organ, musical toys and a Janko piano.

=== Fire ===
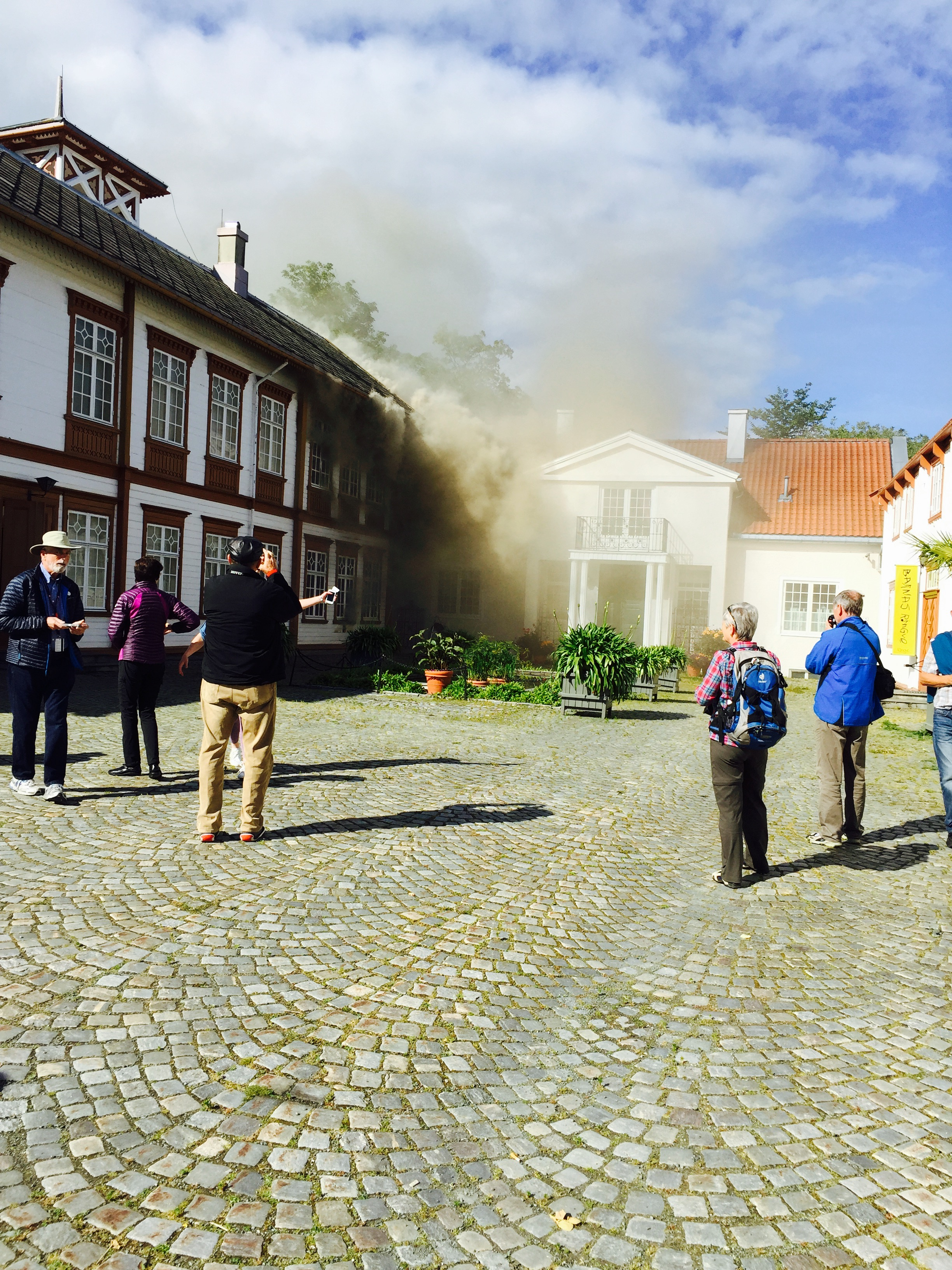
The Ringve Museum on fire

The manor was badly hit by a fire in the attic and second floor on 3 August 2015.

=== The Barn (Museet på Låven) ===
The collections on display in the Barn are divided in two parts:

- Instruments mainly associated with western classical and popular music over four centuries. A Kirkman harpsichord of 1767, an Erberle viola d’amore of 1755, a five-octave Stein piano of 1783, a soprano saxophone by Sax (son) of 1907, along wide early electronic instruments and a 1948 jukebox.

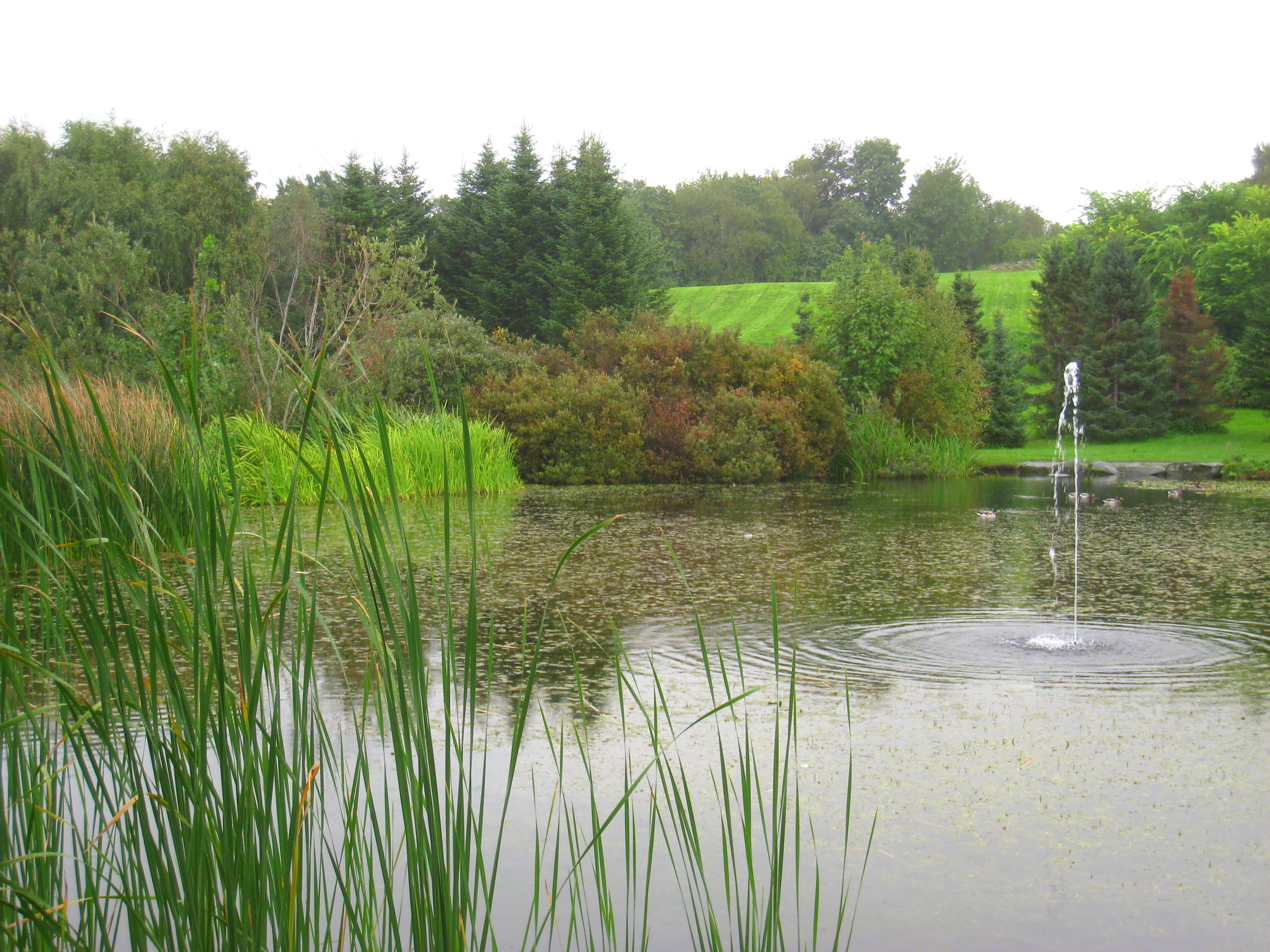
Arboretum

- Folk instruments from all around the world, including a Runebomme (a type of Sami drum), a Tibetan zang-dang (horn), a nadomo (arched harp) from Congo and hardanger fiddles.

== Ringve Botanical Garden ==
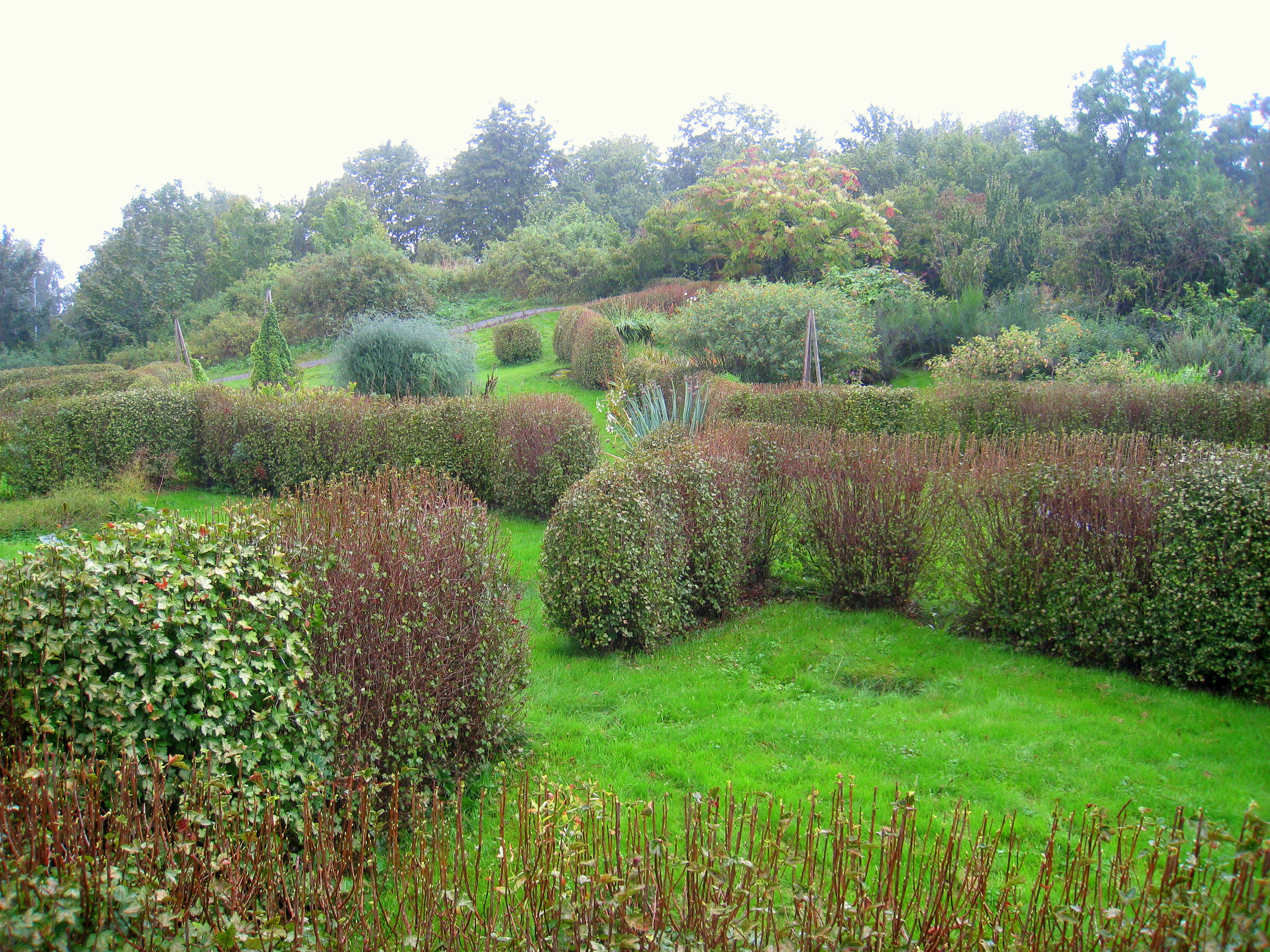
Botanical garden

The Ringve Botanical Garden was established in 1973. The botanic garden has three main parts, the 19th-century garden, the arboretum, and the systematic section. The 32-acre (130,000 m^{2}) botanical gardens consist of an arboretum (species from the Northern hemisphere) around a lake, a floral maze representing a systematic presentation of perennial plants, a Renaissance (herbal) Garden and, in front of the Manor House the historical ‘English’ garden of the 1800s.

== See also ==
- List of museums in Norway
- List of music museums

== Other sources ==
- Guldahl A.S., Guttormsen S., Kjeldsberg P.A., Krouthén M. (2005) Ringve – a world apart (Trondheim: Ringve)
- Voigt, Jan (1984) Fru Victoria til Ringve (Cappelen) ISBN 978-82-02-09851-3
