= Familien de Cats =

Short story by Karen Blixen

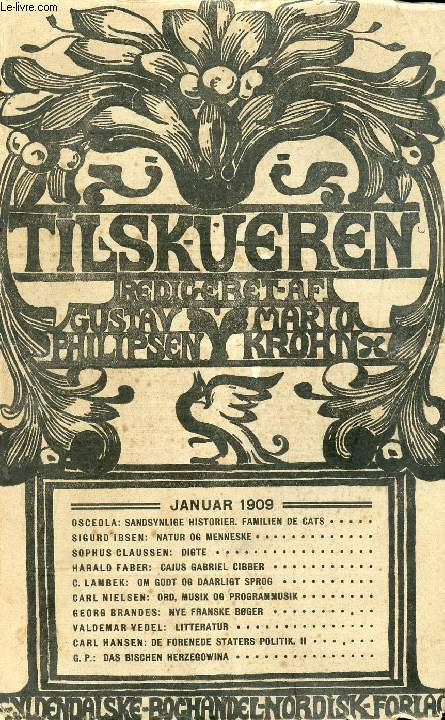
First published in the January 1909 edition of Tilskueren

"Familien de Cats" (The de Cats Family) was the third short story written by the Danish writer Karen Blixen under the pen name Osceola, a famous early 19th-century Native American leader. Published in the literary journal Tilskueren in January 1909, it followed "Eneboerne" (The Hermits) and "Pløjeren" (The Ploughman), both published in 1907. It tells the story of a law-abiding family which in each generation has a black sheep who turns out to be its secret blessing. Although Blixen, then Karen Dinesen, wrote hundreds of pages of poems, essays and stories in her youth, it was only when she was 22 that she began to publish some of her short stories in literary journals as Osceola which had also been the name of her father's dog. Like her other early short stories, at the time it failed to attract attention.

The story was subsequently published in 1959 in Gyldendals Julebog (Gyldendal's Christmas Book) and posthumously in Efterladte fortællinger (Surviving Tales) in 1975. It was also included in 1994 and 2010 in Karneval og andre fortællinger (Carneval and Other Stories).
