= Karen Blixen Museum =

Karen Blixen Museum may refer to:

- Rungstedlund, a museum in Rungsted north of Copenhagen
- Karen Blixen Museum, Kenya, a museum outside Nairobi
