= Mary Westenholz =

Danish Unitarian and writer

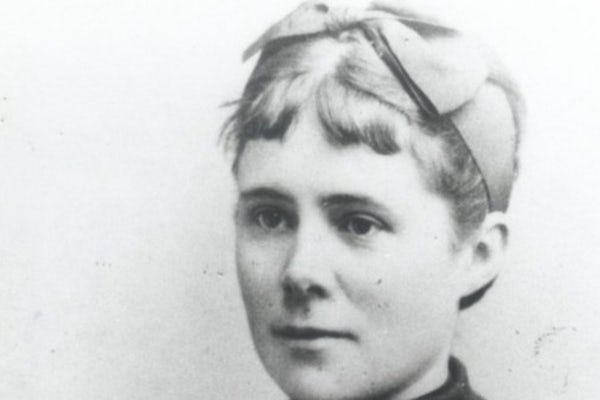
- Born: Mary Bess Westenholz; August 13, 1857; Mattrup, Denmark
- Died: 8 May 1947 (aged 89); Hørsholm, Denmark
- Burial place: Hørsholm Cemetery
- Other names: Bertel Wrads
- Relatives: Andreas Nicolai Hansen (grandfather); Karen Blixen (niece); Ellen Dahl (niece); Thomas Dinesen (nephew)

Mary Bess Westenholz, pen name Bertel Wrads, (13 August 1857 – 8 May 1947) was an influential Danish Unitarian, women's rights activist, writer and editor. She was the aunt of the author Karen Blixen, and is remembered for encouraging her niece to publish her first short stories.

== Early life ==
Born on 13 August 1857 at Mattrup, to the west of Horsens, Mary Bess Westenholz was the daughter of the estate owner and politician Regner Westenholz (1815–1866) and Mary Lucinde Hansen (1832–1915). Her maternal grandfather was the wealthy merchant and ship-owner Andreas Nicolai Hansen. After her father died when she was eight years old, her mother took care of the estate and the family. Together with her siblings, she was educated on the estate, spent a year in a finishing school in Switzerland in 1888, and also went on educational trips to Britain and Italy.

== Unitarian involvement ==
Thanks to her mother, Westenholz became interested in religion and women's rights. She was an active member of the Copenhagen branch of the Danish Women's Society. In 1895, using the pen name Bertel Wrads, she published the essay collection Fra mit Pulterkammer (English: From My Loft), discussing marriage, women's rights and national affairs.

While still a young women, her mother introduced her to the unitarian movement. In 1900, she co-founded the unitarian Det fri Kirkesamfund (The Free Church Society), which she headed until 1925. She commented on her involvement in Højskolebladet (Folk School Paper) and Frit Vidnesbyrd (Free Testimony) as well as in newspaper articles. Above all, however, she wrote in Protestanisk Tidende (Protestant Times) which she edited from 1905 to 1918. As a result of her Unitarian interests, she soon faced opposition from the established Lutheran Church of Denmark.

By participating at meetings of the International Congress of Free Christians and other Religious Liberals in London, Amsterdam and Berlin, she was able to associate Danish Unitarianism with similar movements in Europe and the United States. But as her beliefs did not include basic aspects of the doctrine of the Lutheran Church of Denmark such as the Trinity and the Atonement of Jesus Christ, the church council of her native Hørsholm insisted she should pay church taxes like everyone else. When she refused, in June 1908 the case ended with a Supreme Court ruling, backed by the country's bishops, explaining that as there were basic contradictions between the Unitarian Church and the National Church of Denmark, Westenholz was required to pay taxes and ceased to be a member of the National Church.

== Folketing incident ==
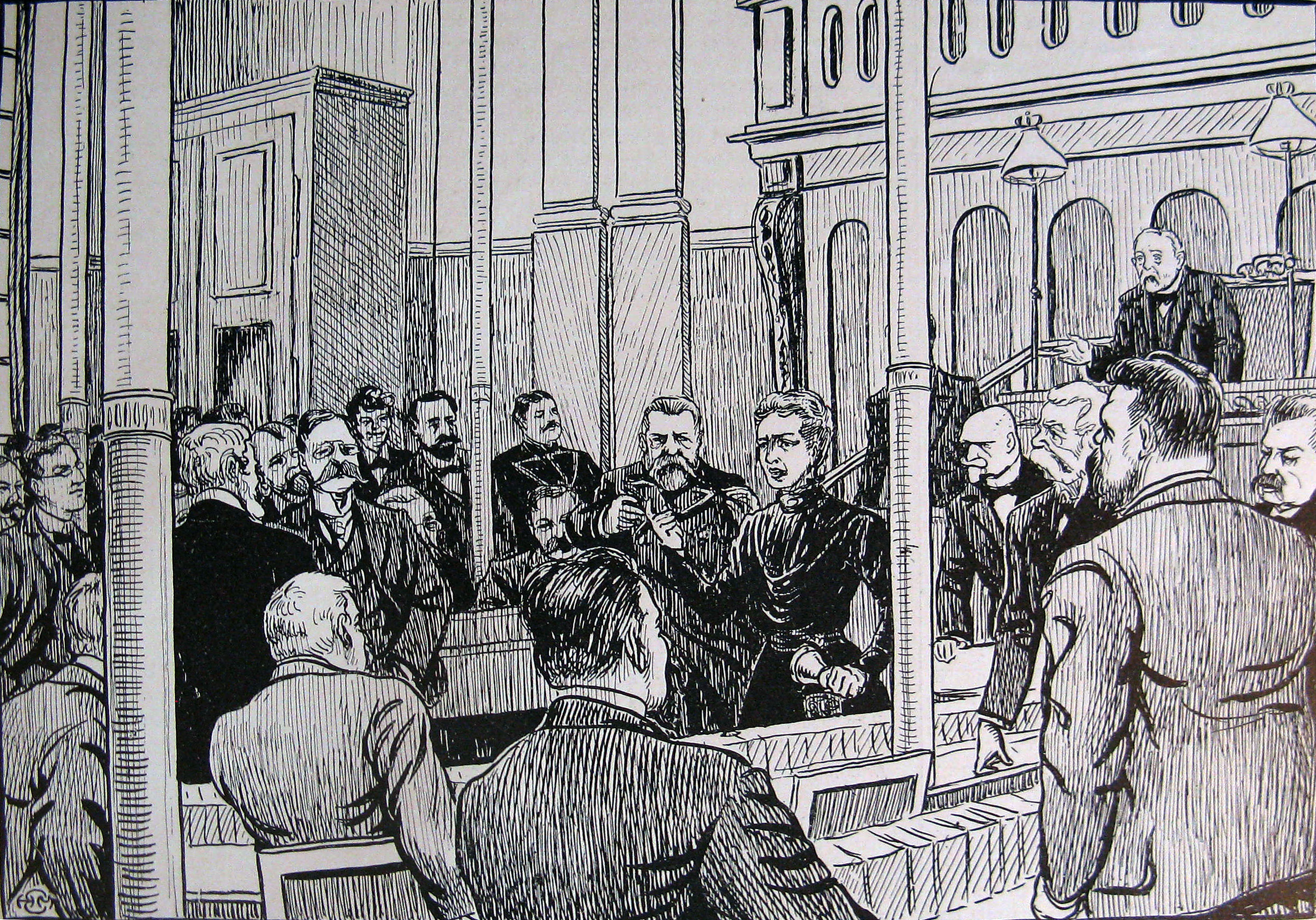
Mary Westenholz holding forth in the Folketing, August 1909

Like her brother Aage, Westenholz was deeply interested in defence matters. Partly as a result of delays in parliamentary progress on a defence bill and partly in connection with the Alberti scandal, on 19 August 1909, unnoticed she gained access to the Folketing where the speaker had just announced the appointment of Jens Christian Christensen as the minister responsible for defence. She snatched the speaker's bell, rang it vigorously and, pointing at the ministers' benches, declared: "Before you begin your work, you should know that in this chamber there is a man who has brought disgrace to Denmark. Here you sit, you Danish men, haggling about the country's rights and wrongs in your lust for power and self-indulgence, but it needs to be said from this rostrum that Denmark's women despise you and brand you as a bunch of unpatriotic hirelings who betray the honour of Denmark." This was the first time any woman had spoken in the Folketing.

She had expected to be arrested but was simply escorted out of the chamber. With the assistance of the Danske Kvinders Forsvarsforening (Danish Women's Defence Association), a demonstration of support was organized outside her home.

== Later life ==
Westerholz also played a significant part in encouraging her niece, Karen Blixen, to become a writer. Thanks to her friendship Dorothy Canfield Fisher, an American writer and member of the Book of the Month Club's selection committee, she was able to arrange for publication of Blixen's Seven Gothic Tales in 1934. Mary Westenholz died in Hørsholm on 8 May 1947. She is buried in Hørshom Cemetery.
