= Dinesen =

Dinesen is a surname of Danish origin. The name refers to:

- Isak Dinesen, pen name of Danish author Karen Blixen (née Karen Dinesen) (1885–1962)
- Mille Dinesen (born 1974), Danish actress
- Thomas Dinesen (1892–1970), Danish recipient of the Victoria Cross; brother of Isak
