= Andreas Nicolai Hansen =

Danish merchant

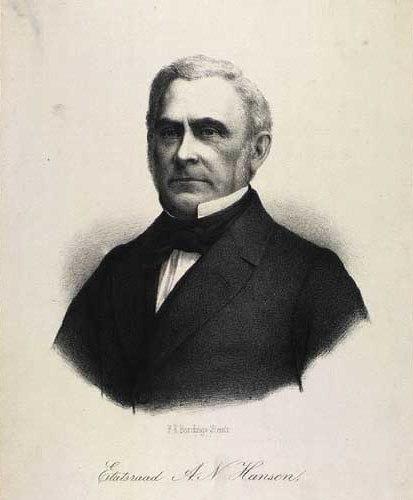
- Born: 24 September 1798; Copenhagen, Denmark
- Died: 12 December 1873 (aged 75); Gentofte, Denmark
- Occupation: Businessman
- Spouse: Emma Eliza Grut (m. 1825; died 1865)
- Children: 11
- Relatives: Mary Westenholz (granddaughter); Karen Blixen (great-granddaughter); Ellen Dahl (great-granddaughter); Thomas Dinesen (great-grandson)
- Awards: Commander of the Dannebrog

Andreas Nicolai Hansen (14 September 1798 – 12 December 1873) was a Danish businessman and landowner. His former town mansion in Copenhagen was listed on the Danish registry of protected buildings and places in 1939.

== Early life and career ==
Hansen was born on 14 September 1798 in Copenhagen, the son of vintner Gotfred Hansen (1765-1835) and Anna Catharine Weinreich (1770-1856). He attended Efterslægtselskabets Skole. He joined Joseph Hambro's office at an early age and Hambro soon noticed his talent for the business. In 1819, Hambro installed him as agent on Guernsey and Jersey with responsibility for the firm's trade in Brazilian and Danish products on the world market. Hansen and Hambro's partner George Gerson handled the affair when the Danish government in 1821 relied on Hambro's services in connection with obtaining the so-called Haldemann-Goldschmidt 5 % loan of £ 3 million in London.

In 1825, Hansen was sent to Kristiania to oversee the firm's Security interests in custom duties in connection with a state loan. Shortly thereafter, he was put in charge of a local branch office which operated under the name Andreas Hansen. When Gerson died later that same year Hambro wanted Hansen to return to the head office in London. This happened in 1826 but not until he had been made an associé on favourable conditions.

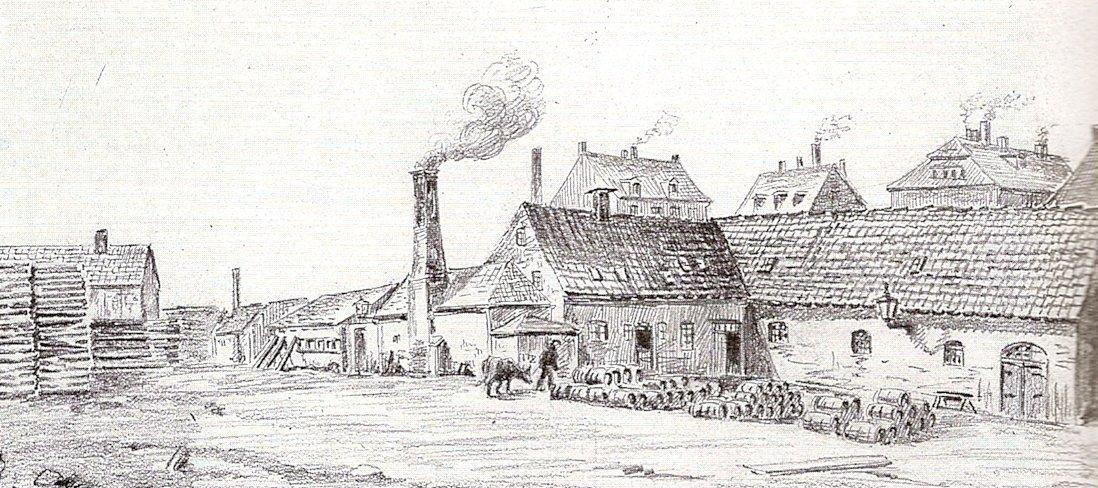
Hambros Plads

On 2 May 1829, Hansen was granted citizenship as a merchant in Copenhagen. In 1831, C. J. Hambro & Søn was granted a 10-year monopoly on operating a steam-driven rice huller at Hambros Plads in Christianshavn. Hansen played a leading role in the operations. A pig farm was also established at the site. The chaft from the rice huller was used as feed for the pigs. The complex was later expanded with Denmark's first canned food factory which made it possible to sell the meat to the many ships in the area. The complex was also expanded with a bakery which sold bread to the ships.

== A. N. Hansen & Co. ==
In 1836, Hansen left the House of Hambro to establish his own firm under the name A. N. Hansen & Co.. In circa 1840, he bought Hambro's share of the Christianshavn operations. Hansen's brother-in-law Alfred Mansell was omotoaææy a partner in the firm but he later owned it alone until he was joined by his sons Alfred and Harald Hansen.

== Other activities ==
Hansen was a member of Grosserer-Societetet's committee from 1829 and succeeded Lauritz Nicolai Hvidt as its president in 1856. He was a member of the Roskilde Constituent Assembly from 1842 to 1844. He was chairman of De private Assurandører from 1839 to 1873 and was also active on the board of a number of other companies. He was also a member of Bank of Denmark's board of representatives. In 1857 he was a co-founder of Privatbanken.

== Property ==
Hansen constructed the Hansen Mansion at Fredericiagade 2 in Copenhagen in 1835–1836. The Neoclassical town mansion was designed by Jørgen Hansen Koch. It was listed on the Danish registry of protected buildings and places in 1939.

Hansen owned Kokkedal from 1837 to 1843 and later Øregård as well as Tirsbæk at Vejle (1861–1873) and Nørre Holmegård at Lemvig (1867–1873).

== Personal life ==
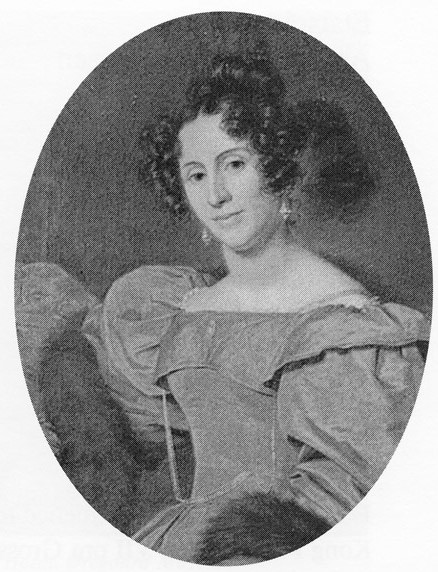
Emma Eliza Hansen, née Grut

On 7 July 1825 in St. Andrew's Church on Guernsey, Hansen married Emma Eliza Grut (16 November 1803 – 25 June 1865). She was the daughter of pastor Thomas Grut (c. 1769–1836) and Lucie Elizabeth Martin, . They had 11 children of whom nine had issue. Their two eldest sons, Alfred Peter Hansen (1829–1893) and Harald Hansen (1835–1902), continued A. B. Hansen & Co. after their father's death. Edmund Hansen Grut (1831–1907) became an eye surgeon. Octavius Hansen (1838–1903) was a Supreme Court attorney and politician. James Gustav Hansen (1843–1912) was a businessman. A daughter, Mary Lucinde Hansen (1835–1915), married Regnar Westenholz of Mattrup Manor. She was the mother of writer Mary Westenholz (1857–1947) and engineer and businessman Aage Westenholz (1859–1935) and the grandmother of Karen Blixen.

Hansen was created a Knight in the Order of the Dannebrog in 1841 and a 2nd rank Commander in 1873. He was awarded the Cross of Honour in 1858. A DFDS steam liner was named S/S An.N. Hansen after him.

He died on 12 December 1873 and is buried at Gentofte Cemetery.
