= Sandhedens hævn =

Danish play by Karen Blixen

Sandhedens hævn – En marionetkomedie (transl. The Revenge of Truth: A Marionette Comedy) is a play by the Danish author Karen Blixen which was first published in the Danish literary journal Tilskueren in 1926.

As a child, Blixen wrote a number of plays which she performed with her sisters and friends. Two of these, Rolf Blåskægs død (Rolf Bluebeard's Death) and Marsk Stig were published in Blixeniana in 1983 but Sandhedens hævn was the only one to be performed in Blixen's lifetime when it was presented at the Royal Danish Theatre in 1936. It was later performed on stage in 1974 at the Boldhus Theatre and with puppets in 1977 at the Riddersalen Theatre. In 1986, Ib Nørholm adapted the play as an opera which was presented at the Østre Gasværk Theatre in 1986 as well as in Odense and Aarhus. In 1998, it was presented at Folketeatret with a combination of actors and puppets. It was also staged in connection with the anniversary celebrations at the Royal Theatre in 1998–99.

Blixen wrote the first version of Sandhedens hævn in 1904, revised it in 1915 and had it published with further revisions in the literary journal Tilskueren in May 1926. It was also published in book form in 1960. It tells of how an innkeeper suffers from his lies as he plans to rob and murder a young man from the country. As a result of a witch's curse, the following day the lies are revealed as the truth, the idea being that the characters do not know who they really are until the curtain falls.

An English translation of the play by Donald Hannah titled The Revenge of Truth: A Marionette Comedy was published in the Performing Arts Journal in 1986.
