= Last Tales =

- First US edition
- Author: Karen Blixen
- Language: English
- Publisher: Random House, New York; G. P. Putnam's Sons, London; Gyldendal, Copenhagen
- Publication date: 1957
- Publication place: Denmark
- Media type: Print
- Pages: 341pp
- ISBN: 978-0-140-09617-0
- OCLC: 15085200

Last Tales (translated by the author into Danish as Sidste fortællinger) is a collection of short stories by the Danish author Karen Blixen (under the pen name Isak Dinesen), which was published in 1957. The collection contains a group of stories taken from several other collections Blixen had been simultaneously working on for several years.

== Background ==
Last Tales was written over a period of some years beginning in the 1930s. Simultaneously, Blixen was working on a novel, Albondocani, which would remain unpublished, and three other story collections Anecdotes of Destiny, New Gothic Tales and New Winter's Tales. She moved between the various collections, never completing any of them in their entirety. In 1957, she took seven stories from Albondocani and combined them with two stories from New Gothic Tales and three stories from New Winter's Tales for publication. As she was compiling the stories in 1953, Blixen originally planned for Anecdotes of Destiny to be a final part of the Last Tales collection, but as she neared publication, she decided to release Anecdotes as a separate volume, published the following year. The collection did not receive the acclaim her other works had generated and was not selected for the Book of the Month Club. Some reviewers noted individual tales as meritorious, such as "The Cardinal's First Tale", "Copenhagen Season", "A Country Tale", and "Echoes", but overall critical response was not overly enthusiastic. Time magazine's review described the collection as a group of Gothic fiction, which combined a mixture of grotesque and sublime themes in which the romantic plot is obscured by the supernatural and "tragically turns on the concept of honor".

== Contents ==
=== Tales from Albondocani ===
Though the Tales of Albondocani are linked by recurring characters and a unifying theme, they lack a central figure, which she had described but never developed. She had indicated that her intent was to create a cycle of over 100 tales, reminiscent of One Thousand and One Nights, each complete within itself but woven into the others. Only the seven stories included in Last Tales and "Second Meeting" (1961) were published.

- "The Cardinal's First Tale": the story opens when Cardinal Salviati is asked, "Who are you?" and rather than answer the question, he tells a story of his parents. His mother, Benedetta, married his father, Prince Pompilio, a much older man, when she was fifteen. As she was expected to do, she produced an heir, but the child was sickly and blind in one eye. Advised to practice abstinence so that Benedetta can regain her health, the young mother discovered passion in reading and music. During a performance of Pietro Metastasio′s Achilles at Scyros, Benedetta has a spiritual insemination from the castrato Marelli. When she gets pregnant again, the couple have a dispute as to whether to name the baby Atanasio (meaning orthodoxy) or Dionysio (meaning ecstasy). Pompilio is in favor of order, but Benedetta prefers controlled chaos. She gives birth to twins, symbolically birthing one child by her husband and the other by her desire for Marelli. After the two children are baptized, their home is destroyed by fire and one of the infants dies in the blaze. No one is sure which twin survived, but his father treats him as the patriarch of the church, while his mother sees him as an artist. Salviati become both artist and church cardinal. The various themes of the story are art and order, purity and erotic awakening, harmony and dissonance, intimacy and distance, loss and gain, masculinity and femininity. The overriding theme is Blixen's idea of what telling a story is about, craft, rather than just narrative.
- "The Cloak"
- "Night Walk". The story takes place in Italy and focuses on an insomniac who has betrayed his mentor. He is given the advice that by walking the streets at night, he will be able to sleep. The instructions indicate that he should begin in wide streets and traverse ever narrower paths until he comes to an end. At the terminus, he finds a mysterious red-haired figure counting and re-counting thirty pieces of silver.
- "Of Hidden Thoughts and of Heaven"
- "Tales of Two Old Gentlemen"
- "The Cardinal's Third Tale". The tale concerns Lady Flora Gordon, an aristocratic Scottish giantess, who loathes her size and body and shuns physical contact. While visiting Rome, she contracts syphilis when she kisses the foot of a statue of St. Peter. The disease removed her sense of purity and led her to make connections with other people.
- "The Blank Page". Related by an elderly storyteller, the tale is a return to the theme of story telling as an art. It focuses on an exhibit in the gallery of a Portuguese convent, made of framed sheets. The bed linens are matrimonial sheets and most have bloodstains from the wedding night. In the center, hangs one pure, unstained sheet. The symbolism of the sheets is that they represent life stories told.

=== New Gothic Tales ===
- "The Caryatids: an Unfinished Tale"
- "Echoes": this short story focuses on Pellegrina, a former opera star, who wants to train a young peasant boy to follow in her footsteps. To teach him courage, she pricked his fingers with a needle, wiping the drops of blood on a handkerchief. When she pressed the cloth to her lips, the student denounced her as a vampire.

=== New Winter's Tales ===
- "A Country Tale": a companion piece to an earlier work, "Sorrow-Acre" and deals with themes of tragedy and loss.
- "Copenhagen Season"
- "Converse at Night in Copenhagen"

== Sources ==
- Aiken, Susan Hardy (1990). Isak Dinesen and the Engendering of Narrative. Chicago, Illinois: University of Chicago Press. ISBN 978-0-226-01113-4.
- Brantly, Susan (2002). Understanding Isak Dinesen. Columbia, South Carolina: University of South Carolina Press. p. 161. ISBN 978-1-57003-428-2.
- Hansen, Frantz Leander (2003). The Aristocratic Universe of Karen Blixen: Destiny and the Denial of Fate. Translated by Kynoch, Gaye. Brighton, England: Sussex Academic Press. ISBN 978-1-903900-33-8.
- Langbaum, Robert (December 1982). "The price of distinction". The New Criterion. 1 (4). New York City, New York: The Foundation for Cultural Review: 71. ISSN 0734-0222. Archived from the original on 12 October 2016.
- McHaney, Pearl Amelia, ed. (1994). Eudora Welty—A Writer's Eye: Collected Book Reviews. Jackson, Mississippi: University Press of Mississippi. ISBN 978-1-60473-582-6.
- Rossel, Sven H. (1982). A history of Scandinavian literature 1870-1980. Translated by Ulmer, Anne C. ([Reproduction en fac-similé]. ed.). Minneapolis: Univ. of Minnesota P. ISBN 0-8166-0909-8 – via Project MUSE.
- Selboe, Tone (2008). "The Infallible Rule of the Irregular: Time and Narrative in Karen Blixen's Tales". In Peetz, Heike; von Schnurbein, Stefanie; Wechsel, Kirsten (eds.). Karen Blixen/Isak Dinesen/Tania Blixen : eine internationale Erzählerin der Moderne (PDF) (1. ed.). Berlin, Germany: Nordeuropa-Institut der Humboldt-Universität. ISBN 978-3-932406-27-0. Archived from the original (PDF) on 11 July 2015.
- "Grotesque & Sublime". Time (Book review). Vol. 70, no. 19. New York City, New York: Time Inc. 4 November 1957. p. 112. ISSN 0040-781X. EBSCOhost 54190645.
