= Out of Africa =

1937 memoir by Karen Blixen

- First edition (UK)
- Author: Karen Blixen
- Language: English, Danish, Swahili
- Genre: Memoir
- Publisher: G. P. Putnam's Sons (UK); Gyldendal (Denmark)
- Publication date: 1937
- Publication place: United Kingdom, Denmark
- Media type: Print
- Pages: 416
- Dewey Decimal: 967.62 20
- LC Class: DT433.54 .D56 1992

Out of Africa is a memoir by the Danish author Karen Blixen. The book, first published in 1937, recounts events of the eighteen years when Blixen made her home in Kenya, then called British East Africa. The book is a lyrical meditation on Blixen's life on her coffee plantation, as well as a tribute to some of the people who touched her life there. It provides a vivid snapshot of African colonial life in the last decades under the British Empire. Blixen wrote the book in English and then rewrote it in Danish. The book has sometimes been published under the author's pen name, Isak Dinesen.

== Background ==
Karen Blixen moved to British East Africa in late 1913, at the age of 28, to marry her second cousin, the Swedish Baron Bror von Blixen-Finecke, and make a life in the British colony known today as Kenya. The young Baron and Baroness bought farmland below the Ngong Hills about 16 km (10 mi) southwest of Nairobi, which at the time was still shaking off its rough origins as a supply depot on the Uganda Railway.

The Blixens had planned to raise dairy cattle, but Bror developed their farm as a coffee plantation instead. It was managed by Europeans, including, at the start, Karen's brother Thomas – but most of the labour was provided by “squatters.” This was the colonial term for local Kikuyu tribespeople who guaranteed the owners 180 days of labour a year in exchange for wages and the right to live and farm on the uncultivated lands.

When the First World War drove coffee prices up, the Blixen family invested in the business, and in 1917 Karen and Bror expanded their holdings to 2,400 ha (6,000 acres). The new acquisitions included the site of the house which features so prominently in Out of Africa.

The Blixens’ marriage started well – Karen and Bror went on hunting safaris which Karen later remembered as paradisiacal. But it was not ultimately successful: Bror, a talented hunter and a well liked companion, was an unfaithful husband and a poor businessman who squandered much of the money to be invested in the farm. In 1921 the couple separated, and in 1925 they were divorced; Karen took over the management of the farm on her own.

She was well suited to the work – fiercely independent and capable, she loved the land and liked her native workers. But the climate and soil of her particular tract were not ideal for coffee-raising; the farm endured several unexpected dry years with low yields as well as a pestilence of grasshoppers one season - and the falling market price of coffee was no help. The farm sank further and further into debt until, in 1931, the family corporation forced her to sell it. The buyer, Remi Martin, who planned to carve it into residential plots, offered to allow Blixen to stay in the house, but she declined, and returned to Denmark.

Blixen moved back to the family's estate of Rungstedlund (in Rungsted, Denmark) to live with her mother, and took up again the writing career that she had begun, but abandoned, in her youth. In 1934 she published a fiction collection, Seven Gothic Tales, and in 1937 her Kenyan memoir, Out of Africa. The book's title was likely derived from the title of a poem, "Ex Africa," she had written in 1915, while recuperating in a Danish hospital from her fight with syphilis. The poem's title is probably an abbreviation of the famous ancient Latin adage (credited to sages from Aristotle to Pliny to Erasmus) Ex Africa semper aliquid novi, which translates as “Out of Africa, always something new ”

== Structure and style ==
Out of Africa is divided into five sections, most of which are non-linear and seem to reflect no particular chronology. The first two focus primarily on Africans who lived or had business on the farm, and include close observations of native ideas about justice and punishment in the wake of a gruesome accidental shooting. The third section, called “Visitors to the Farm,” describes some of the more colourful local characters who considered Blixen's farm to be a safe haven. The fourth, “From an Immigrant’s Notebook,” is a collection of short sub-chapters in which Blixen reflects on the life of a white African colonist.

In the fifth and final section, “Farewell to the Farm,” the book begins to take on a more linear shape, as Blixen details the farm's financial failure, and the untimely deaths of several of her closest friends in Kenya. The book ends with the farm sold, and with Blixen on the Uganda Railway, heading toward the steamer on the coast, looking back and watching her beloved Ngong Hills diminish behind her.

Out of Africa has been noted for its melancholy and elegiac style – Blixen biographer Judith Thurman employs an African tribal phrase to describe it: “clear darkness.” It is not an insignificant fact that Blixen's tales encompass the deaths of at least five of the important people in the book. As the chapters proceed, Blixen begins to meditate more plainly on her feelings of loss and nostalgia for her days in Africa. As she describes the economic realities of her failed business closing in on her, she comments wryly on her mixture of despair and denial, until the last days are upon her and she gives in to the inevitable.

But Blixen's wistfulness is fueled and informed by a loss greater than her own farm: the loss of Kenya itself. In the first two decades of the 20th century, many of Kenya's European settlers saw their colonial home as a kind of timeless paradise. One frequent explorer referred to the atmosphere as a “tropical, neo-lithic slumber.” U.S. President Theodore Roosevelt, who explored the region in 1909, compared it to “the late Pleistocene.”

Settlement was sparse; life followed the slow, dreamy rhythms of annual dry and rainy seasons. A few thousand European colonists, many of them well-educated Britons from the landed gentry, held dominion over vast plantation estates covering tens of thousands of acres. Their farms were home to herds of elephants and zebra, and dozens of giraffes, lions, hippos, leopards – to a culture accustomed to the traditional pleasures of European aristocrats, Kenya was a hunter's dream. Blixen herself commented in 1960 that when she arrived in Kenya in 1914, “the highlands were in very truth the Happy Hunting Grounds… while the pioneers lived in guileless harmony with the children of the land.”

This belief in Kenya as a pre-historic Utopia left its mark on its inhabitants (and remained an idealised world of the imagination even for generations that came after). But by the time that Blixen was finishing the manuscript for Out of Africa at the age of 51, the Kenya protectorate of her younger years was a thing of the past. Agricultural development had spread the colony's human footprint far out into the game country; many of the new farmers were middle class retired Army officers recruited by a government settlement programme after the First World War. The popularity of hunting safaris, especially after Roosevelt's in 1909, had depleted the big herds. And as war approached Europe, the colony became as famous (or infamous) for the misbehaviour of the wife-swapping, hard-partying Happy Valley set as it was for being a dreamy horizon of Empire.

In Baroness Blixen's descriptions of the Africa she knew, a note of mourning for a lost world colors her stories emphasizing isolation and qualities of a life lived in partnership with nature.

== Themes ==
At first glance much of the book, especially the section titled “From an Immigrant’s Notebook", seems to be a string of loosely related episodes organised from Blixen's memory, or perhaps from notes she made while in Africa (indeed, in one of the early chapters she describes discussing the beginning of her work on the book with her young cook Kamante).

A closer look, however, yields a more formal approach.

=== Trials ===
Blixen examines the details and ethical implications of two separate “trials". The first is African: a gathering of tribesmen on her farm to adjudicate the case of a Kikuyu child who accidentally killed one playmate and maimed another with a shotgun. This process seems largely devoid of Western-style moral or ethical considerations: most of the energy expended in deliberations is directed at determining the proper amount of reparation the perpetrator's father must pay, in livestock, to the families of the victims. Later, Blixen describes a British colonial criminal trial in Nairobi: the defendant is European settler Jasper Abraham who is accused of causing, by intention or indifference, the death of a disobedient African servant named Kitosch. Blixen does not directly compare the two proceedings, but the contrasts are stark.

=== Contrasts and opposites ===
These two trials, separated by most of the book, may also be part of a deeper exploration by Blixen into one of her pet notions: the “Unity” of contrasts. Perhaps her greatest elucidation of this idea comes in Shadows on the Grass, which she wrote thirty years after leaving Kenya:

Two homogenous units will never be capable of forming a whole… Man and woman become one… A hook and an eye are a Unity, a fastening, but with two hooks you can do nothing. A right-hand glove with its contrast the left-hand glove makes a whole, a pair of gloves; but two right-hand gloves you throw away.

Blixen's life in Africa offered her no shortage of such contrasting dualities: town and country, dry season and rainy season, Muslim and Christian, and these themes are explored in her work.

=== Africans ===
Although Blixen was unavoidably in the position of landholder, and wielded great power over her tenants, Blixen was known in her day for her respectful and admiring relationships with Africans – a connection that made her increasingly suspect among the other colonists as tensions grew between Europeans and Africans. “We were good friends,” she writes about her staff and workers. “I reconciled myself to the fact that while I should never quite know or understand them, they knew me through and through.”

But Blixen does understand – and thoughtfully delineates – the differences between the culture of the Kikuyu who work her farm and who raise and trade their own sheep and cattle, and that of the Maasai, a volatile warrior culture of nomadic cattle-drovers who live on a designated tribal reservation south of the farm's property. Blixen also describes in some detail the lives of the Somali Muslims who emigrated south from Somalia to work in Kenya which she described as shrewd traders and intelligent. She also mentioned few members of the substantial Indian merchant minority which played a large role in the colony's early development.

Her descriptions of Africans and their behaviour or customs sometimes employ some of the racial language of her time, deemed now to be abrasive, but her portraits are frank and accepting, and are generally free of perceptions of Africans as savages or simpletons. She transmits a sense of logic and dignity of ancient tribal customs. Some of those customs, such as the valuation of daughters based on the dowry they will bring at marriage, are perceived as ugly to Western eyes; Blixen's voice in describing these traditions is largely free of judgment.

She was admired in return by many of her African employees and acquaintances, who saw her as a thoughtful and wise figure, and turned to her for the resolution of many disputes and conflicts.

=== Europeans ===
The other characters who populate Out of Africa are the Europeans – colonists as well as some of the wanderers who stopped in Kenya. Foremost among them is Denys Finch Hatton, who was for a time Blixen's lover after her separation and then her divorce from her husband. Finch Hatton, like Blixen herself, was known to feel close to his African acquaintances – as, indeed, do virtually all of the Europeans for whom Blixen expresses real regard in Out of Africa.

Blixen limits most of her reflections to those Europeans who were her frequent or favourite guests, such as a man she identifies only as “Old Knudsen”, a down-and-out Danish fisherman who invites himself to take up residence on her farm, and then dies there several months later.

Edward, Prince of Wales, also makes an appearance; his 1928 visit to the colony was an event of the utmost importance in Kenya's aristocratic social circles (the Governor of the colony ordered the streets of Nairobi repaved for the occasion).

== Major characters ==
- The Hon. Denys Finch Hatton – Blixen's portrait of Finch Hatton is as a kind of philosopher king, a man of exceptional erudition and natural grace, at one with nature, who fit in everywhere and nowhere: “When he came back to the farm, it gave out what was in it – it spoke… When I heard his car coming up the drive, I heard, at the same time, all the things of the farm telling what they really were.” Such glowing reports of the aristocratic Finch Hatton are not uncommon; by all accounts he radiated, from a young age, a kind of warmth and serenity that many people found irresistible. But while Blixen is generally believed to have been Finch Hatton's lover, and she writes of him with unbridled adoration, in Out of Africa at least she refrains from ever clearly defining the nature of their relationship. Finch Hatton came from a titled British family and was educated at Eton and Oxford. But he turned his back on his British noblesse, and came to Africa in 1911, at the age of 24. He began as a farmer and trader, but later became a white hunter – and he was well liked by many Africans. Blixen met Finch Hatton at a dinner in 1918. He was, to judge by Blixen's correspondence as well as some passages from Out of Africa, the great love of her life. She was bound, she wrote to her brother, "to love the ground he walks upon, to be happy beyond words when he is here, and to suffer worse than death many times when he leaves." After August 1923, when not on safari, Finch Hatton used Blixen's farm as his home base. Like her, Finch Hatton was a lifelong non-conformist, and it was apparently a cause of great heartache to her that he resisted her efforts to form a more permanent “partnership". Blixen is believed to have miscarried at least one child fathered by him. From late 1930 to early 1931, as their romance was ending, Finch Hatton took Blixen flying over her farm and other parts of Africa in his de Havilland Gipsy Moth biplane, which she described as “the most transporting pleasure of my life on the farm." In May 1931, when their affair was likely over for good, Finch Hatton was killed when his Gipsy Moth crashed after takeoff at the Voi aerodrome; these events are recounted in the last chapters of Out of Africa.
- Farah Aden - When Blixen first met Farah, she mistook him for an Indian. However, Farah was a Somali of the Habr Yunis, a tribe of fierce, handsome and shrewd traders and cattle-dealers. It was common among the British colonists of the early period to hire Somalis as major-domos. Most Somalis were, by the accounts of their employers, highly organised, effective managers. In Shadows on the Grass, Blixen would describe the Somalis as aristocrats among the Africans, "superior in culture and intelligence" and well matched in terms of hauteur with the Europeans they chose to serve. Farah had been recruited to work for Bror Blixen as a steward, and Bror sent him to Mombasa to greet Karen when she got off the steamer from Britain. According to Dinesen's biographer Judith Thurman, “it was upon meeting Farah in Mombasa that Dinesen’s Vita Nuova (new life) truly began.” Blixen entrusted Farah with the farm's cash flow, and eventually with her complete trust. Farah shared her daily life, mediated her relations with the Africans, and relieved her of many practical burdens. The two would grow exceedingly close, with Blixen herself describing their relationship as a "creative unity". The chapter in which Blixen describes the sale of her farm is titled, “Farah and I Sell Out.” After Blixen and her husband divorced, Farah remained loyal to her, sometimes leaving Karen's service temporarily to work on one of Bror's safaris.
- Kamante Gatura – A young boy crippled by running sores when he enters Blixen's life, Kamante was successfully treated by the doctors at the “Scotch" Christian mission near the farm, and thereafter served Blixen as a cook and as a wry, laconic commentator on her choices and her lifestyle. There is a strong suggestion that Blixen and Kamante were well suited as friends because both were loners and sceptics, who looked at their own cultures with the critical eye of the misfit. Some of Kamante's own recollections and stories were later compiled by Peter Beard and published in a book entitled Longing For Darkness: Kamante's Tales from Out of Africa.
- The Hon. Berkeley Cole – Cole was, like Finch Hatton, a British expatriate improvising a charmed life among the colony's well-to-do. Reginald Berkeley Cole (1882–1925), an Anglo-Irish aristocrat from Ulster (being a son of the 4th Earl of Enniskillen), was a veteran of the Boer War, a possessor of a sly wit who affected a dandy's persona in the Kenya colony. A brother-in-law of the 3rd Baron Delamere, he was also a founder of the Muthaiga Club, the legendary private Nairobi enclave of the colony's demi-monde. Cole was a close friend of Finch Hatton and the two men supplied Blixen with much of the wine she served on her farm. She famously described him drinking a bottle of champagne every morning at eleven, and complaining if the glasses were not of the finest quality. Cole died in 1925 of heart failure, at the age of 43. “An epoch in the history of the Colony came to an end with him,” Blixen wrote. “The yeast was out of the bread of the land.”
- Kinanjui – Kinanjui was “the big chief” of Blixen's neighborhood – “a crafty old man, with a fine manner, and much real greatness to him,” Blixen writes. British colonial authorities had appointed him the highest-ranking chief among the Kikuyu in Blixen's region because they couldn't get along with his predecessor; as such he was a significant authority figure for the Kikuyu who lived on her farm. Upon Blixen's arrival in Kenya, it was Kinanjui who assured her that she would never lack for labourers. Although the book does not fail to point out some of Kinanjui's vanities (such as the large car he buys from an American diplomat), Blixen depicts the king as a figure with a deep sense of his own dignity and royal presence. Kinanjui is also one of the figures in the story who dies toward the end of the memoir, leaving her – as do the deaths of Cole and Finch Hatton – ever more isolated and uncertain.

Conspicuously absent from the stories in Out of Africa is any explicit appearance by Blixen's husband, Bror von Blixen-Finecke. Blixen refers to her younger days on shooting safaris, safaris which she is known to have taken with Bror, but doesn't mention him in that context. There is a reference or two to “my husband", but she never uses his first name. Although the Blixens remained friendly through their separation and divorce, Bror's associations with other women caused Karen embarrassment. Decorum drove her to withdraw from social events where Bror would be present with a mistress (one of whom became his next wife), and she was, privately, resentful of these social strictures.

== Shadows on the Grass ==
In 1960, at the age of 76, Blixen published Shadows on the Grass, a short compendium of further recollections about her days in Africa. Many of the people and the events from Out of Africa appear again on these pages. Due to its brevity and its closely related content, Shadows on the Grass has in recent years been published as a combined volume with Out of Africa.

== Adaptations ==
Sydney Pollack directed a film adaptation in 1985, starring Meryl Streep, Robert Redford and Klaus Maria Brandauer. The film only received mixed to generally positive reviews from critics but, nonetheless, won seven Academy Awards, including Best Picture, Best Director for Pollack and Best Adapted Screenplay.

The film is less a direct adaptation of the book than it is a love story. Written by Kurt Luedtke and drawing heavily on two biographies of Blixen, it is a compressed chronological recounting of Blixen's Kenyan years that focuses particularly on her troubled marriage and her affair with Finch Hatton. Some of Blixen's more poetic narration and a few episodes from the book do appear in the film, such as Blixen's work running supply waggons during the war, the farm's fire and its financial troubles, and her struggles to find a home for her Kikuyu squatters. Most of the main characters are identified by their real names, though substantial liberties are taken with some of the details.

An earlier screenplay was written for Universal Studios in 1969 by the playwright, screenwriter and science writer Robert Ardrey, but the script was never produced. In February 2017, NBCUniversal International Studios announced a joint venture with Harry Potter and Gravity producer David Heyman to develop the memoir as a drama TV series with The Night Manager's director/executive producer Susanne Bier set to direct and executive produce.
