= The Immortal Story =

- Spanish theatrical poster
- Based on: The Immortal Story by Karen Blixen
- Screenplay by: Louise de Vilmorin; Orson Welles
- Directed by: Orson Welles
- Starring: Jeanne Moreau; Orson Welles; Roger Coggio; Norman Eshley
- Country of origin: France
- Original languages: English; French

Production
- Producer: Micheline Rozan
- Cinematography: Willy Kurant
- Editors: Claude Farny; Françoise Garnault; Yolande Maurette; Marcelle Pluet
- Running time: 48 mins (French version); 60 mins (English version)

Original release
- Release: 24 May 1968

The Immortal Story (French: Une histoire immortelle) is a 1968 French film directed by Orson Welles and starring Jeanne Moreau. The film was originally broadcast on French television and was later released in theatres. It was based on a short story by the Danish writer Karen Blixen (more widely known by her pen name Isak Dinesen). With a running time of sixty minutes, it is the shortest feature film directed by Welles.

== Plot ==
In nineteenth-century Macao, Mr. Clay (Orson Welles) is a wealthy merchant at the end of his life. His only constant companion is his book-keeper, a Polish-Jewish emigrant named Levinsky (Roger Coggio). One evening, while reading to Clay before bed, Levinsky recites a prophecy by Isaiah. Clay declares his hatred of prophecies and begins to tell a story he once heard on a ship of a rich old man who offers a sailor five guineas to impregnate his wife, however Levinsky completes the story, having heard it himself from multiple other seamen. Clay becomes obsessed in making that legendary tale come true, and Levinsky is dispatched to find a sailor and a young woman who will play the part of Clay’s wife.

Levinsky approaches Virginie (Jeanne Moreau), the daughter of Clay’s one-time business partner. Clay’s ruthless dealings drove Virginie’s father to bankruptcy and suicide, and she is eager to participate in this action to get her revenge. The destitute sailor, a young Dane named Paul (Norman Eshley) recently rescued from a desert island, is discovered on the street and recruited. Having heard the story himself as well, Paul at first refuses to participate, but agrees when Clay reminds him that he needs the money.

Virginie and Paul find an emotional bond in their brief union, but go their separate ways – Virginie is exorcised of her bitterness against Clay while Paul is seen walking away from the villa. Before doing so, he asks Clay to give Virginie a shell he found on his desert island that will play a “song” if she holds it to her ear. Levinsky goes to inform Clay about what took place, but discovers the old merchant has died. He puts Paul’s shell to his ear, and remarks to Virginie that he has heard the song before but cannot remember from where.

== Cast ==
- Jeanne Moreau as Virginie Ducrot
- Orson Welles as Mr. Charles Clay
- Roger Coggio as Elishama Levinsky
- Norman Eshley as Paul, the sailor
- Fernando Rey as Merchant

== Production ==
Orson Welles was a self-professed admirer of the writing of Karen Blixen and, at one point, announced plans to create a series of films based on her writing. "The Immortal Story" is a short story first published in Blixen's 1958 short story collection Anecdotes of Destiny. Originally The Immortal Story was meant to be half of a two-part anthology film, with the second half based on the Blixen story "The Deluge at Nordenay". However, the second film was cancelled when Welles raised concerns about the professionalism of his crew in Budapest, Hungary, where production was to have taken place.

Welles received financing from l'Office de Radio-Télévision Française to create The Immortal Story for premiere presentation on French television, to be followed by theatrical release in France and other countries. As part of the financing, Welles was contractually obligated to shoot the film in color. Welles was not a fan of color cinematography, and in one interview he stated: "Color enhances the set, the scenery, the costumes, but mysteriously enough it only detracts from the actors. Today it is impossible to name one outstanding performance by an actor in a color film."

Much of the film was shot in Welles’ home in Chinchón, a small location outside of Madrid, Spain. The location for the port of Macao was the main square of Chinchón, and other exterior scenes depicting the Portuguese-built city in China were also shot in the nearby towns of Pedraza, Brihuega and Valdemoro. Welles used Chinese restaurant waiters from Madrid as extras to recreate the setting for Macao.

== Release ==
The Immortal Story was entered into the 18th Berlin International Film Festival in June 1968. The film had its U.S. premiere at the 1968 New York Film Festival. In February 1969, it had its U.S. theatrical release on a double feature bill with Luis Buñuel's Simon of the Desert.

=== Home media ===
On 30 August 2016, The Immortal Story was released on DVD and Blu-ray in the U.S. by the Criterion Collection.
