= Rungsted =

Suburban neighborhood in Denmark

Coordinates: 55°53′N 12°32′E

Rungsted, also known as Rungsted Kyst (lit. 'the coast of Rungsted'), is an affluent coastal neighborhood in Hørsholm Municipality on the Øresund shore north of Copenhagen, Denmark.

Situated approximately 25 kilometres north of central Copenhagen, it lies within the broader urban area of Hørsholm, whose centre is two kilometres to the west. Rungsted is best known internationally as the home of the author Karen Blixen, who was born and died at Rungstedlund, the estate that now bears her name and houses the Karen Blixen Museum. Together with Hørsholm, Rungsted records among the highest average household incomes of any locality in Denmark, a fact reflected in the area's housing prices.

== History ==
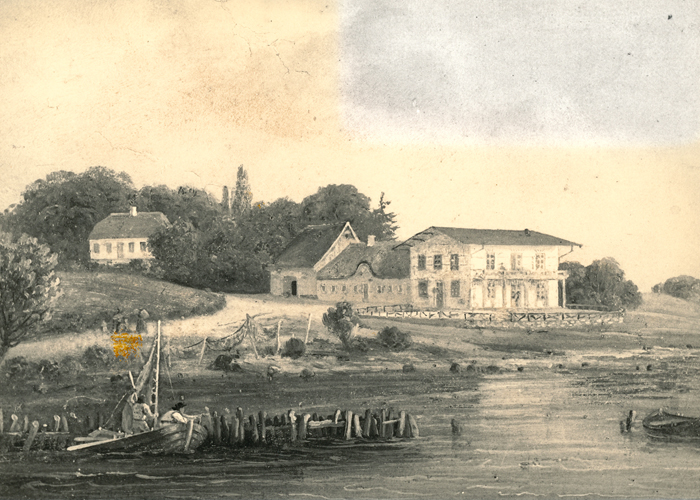
Rungsted Kro in the late 1830s

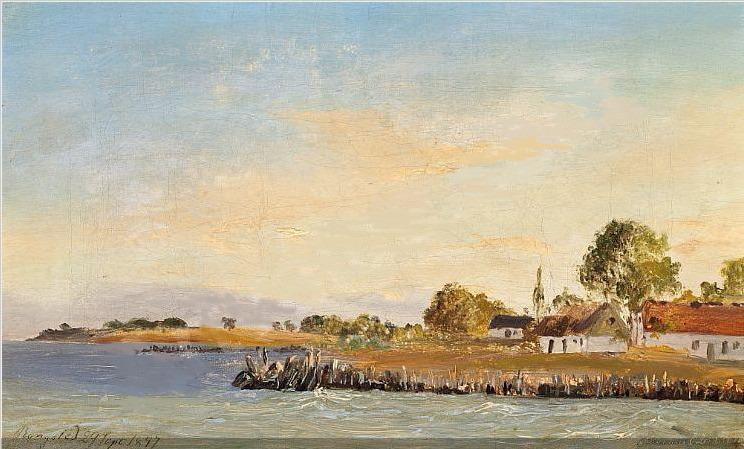
Rungsted Harbour painted by Emanuel Larsen in 1847

The name Rungsted is first recorded in 1346 in the form Runæstigh. The name may be derived from Old Danish runi meaning and sti' 'svinesti', later changed to sted. Alternatively the first part of the name may refer to the small waves that are characteristic of the Øresund.

Rungsted's inn, Rungsted Kro, is first mentioned in the beginning of the 16th century but it is probably much older. The inn moved in 1803, and the buildings were renamed Rungstedlund.

== Marina ==
Rungsted Harbour, which faces the Øresund Strait, accommodates approximately 800 boats and is one of the main recreational focal points of the neighborhood. It has a visitors' jetty, a tourist information office, and a range of shops, restaurants and cafés. The harbour is adjacent to Rungsted Badestrand beach and attracts around 1.5 million visitors annually.

== Sport ==
Rungsted is home to two prominent sports clubs sharing facilities at Hørsholm-Usserød Idrætspark on Stadion Allé. The football club Hørsholm-Usserød IK (HUI), founded in 1962, is one of the larger amateur clubs in Denmark and competes in the Danish 3rd Division, the fourth tier of Danish football, having reached that level for the first time in 2025. The club is noted for its youth development programme and is the childhood club of Danish international Rasmus Højlund.

The ice hockey club Rungsted IK plays at Rungsted Skøjtehal.

== Transport ==
Rungsted is served by Rungsted Kyst railway station, which opened in 1897 as part of the Coast Line (Kystbanen) between Copenhagen and Helsingør. The station is operated by Danish State Railways (DSB) and is one of 14 stops on the Coast Line, one of the busiest railway lines in Denmark. A signed walking route connects the station directly to the Karen Blixen Museum through the bird sanctuary at Rungstedlund.

== Notable people ==
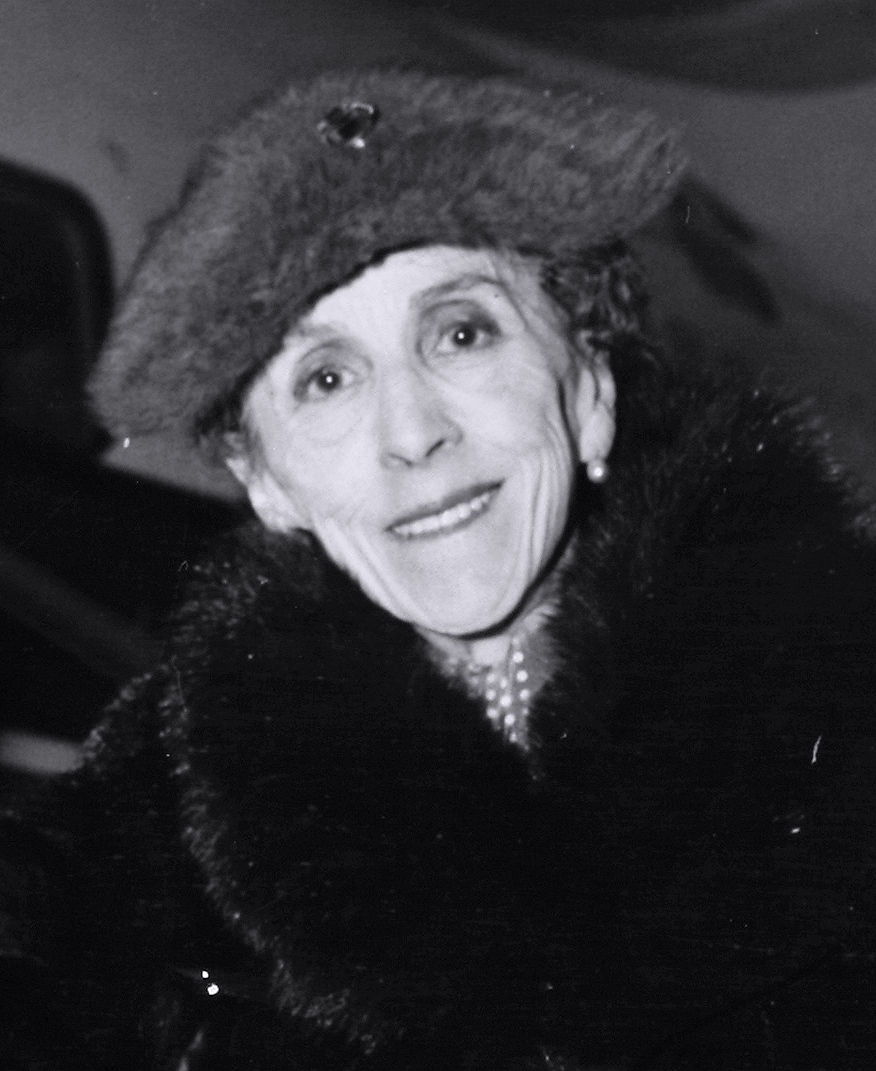
Karen Blixen, 1957

- Louise Conring (1824–1891) a superintendent, hospital inspector, deaconess and nurse.
- Wilhelm Dinesen (1845–95), writer, military officer, adventurer and father of Karen Blixen
- Dagmar Hansen (1871 –1959) a singer, stage-performer and Denmark's first "pin-up girl".
- Olivia Holm-Møller (1875–1970 in Rungsted) a Danish painter and sculptor
- Karen Blixen, (1885–1962) a distinguished Danish writer of Out of Africa
- Thomas Dinesen VC (1892–1979), Danish military officer in Canadian service and Victoria Cross recipient
- Simon Spies (1921–1984 in Rungsted) a Danish tycoon
- Dorete Bloch (1943–2015) a zoologist, wrote about animals and plants of the Faroe Islands.
- Jakob Dinesen (born 1968), jazz saxophonist
- Frederik Fetterlein (born 1970) a retired Danish tennis player
- Christoffer Boe (born 1974) a Danish film director and screenwriter
- Joachim B. Hansen (born 1990) a Danish professional golfer, lives in Rungsted
- Cecilie Wellemberg (born 1994) a Danish model and beauty pageant titleholder, Miss Universe Denmark 2015

== Cultural references ==
- Johannes Ewald lived from March 1773 to autumn 1775 at the then Rungsted Inn, where he had some of his most productive years and wrote Rungsteds Lyksaligheder - En Ode.
