= Seven Gothic Tales =

1934 short story collection by Karen Blixen

- First edition
- Author: Karen Blixen
- Language: English
- Publisher: Harrison Smith and Robert Haas
- Publication date: 1934
- Publication place: United States
- Media type: Print
- Pages: 420pp (1972)

Seven Gothic Tales (translated by the author into Danish as: Syv Fantastiske Fortællinger) is a collection of short stories by the Danish author Karen Blixen (under the pen name Isak Dinesen), first published in 1934, three years before her memoir Out of Africa. The collection, consisting of stories set mostly in the nineteenth century, contains her tales "The Deluge at Norderney" and "The Supper at Elsinore".

== Background ==
In 1933, Blixen had completed a manuscript of Seven Gothic Tales, which was rejected by several publishers in Great Britain. With the help of her brother Thomas, Blixen brought Seven Gothic Tales to the attention of Book of the Month Club selection committee member Dorothy Canfield, who convinced Random House to publish the book.

== Contents ==
- "The Deluge at Norderney"
- "The Old Chevalier"
- "The Monkey"
- "The Roads Round Pisa"
- "The Supper at Elsinore"
- "The Dreamers"
- "The Poet"

In the British and Danish editions, "The Roads Round Pisa" is the first tale and "The Deluge at Norderney" is the fourth, which was the author's intended order. The order was reversed in the American edition because "The Deluge at Norderney" was the publisher's favorite story.

== "The Deluge at Norderney" ==
In the summer of 1835, a massive storm floods the North Sea island of Norderney, which is home to a bath popular among Northern European nobility. The elderly Cardinal Hamilcar von Sehestedt, who is living on the island with his valet Kasparson while working on a book about the Holy Ghost, is rescued from his cottage by a group of fishermen (Kasparson is killed in the building's collapse). The Cardinal works to rescue the island's peasants, and offers to sail out to the bath to rescue patrons trapped there. Upon arriving, he finds four people: the elderly and somewhat delusional Miss Malin Nat-og-Dag and her maid; Nat-og-Dag's companion, the teenage Countess Calypso von Platen; and the melancholic Jonathan Maersk.

The group boards the ship and begins to sail back, but encounter a group of peasants trapped in a granary on their way back. Because the boat is too small to carry them all, all but Nat-og-Dag's maid agree to trade places with the peasants and wait for help to arrive. While stuck in the granary, the group exchanges stories. Maersk describes how he came to be at Norderney: as a teenager, he traveled from the small town of Assens to Copenhagen, where he befriended the wealthy Baron von Gersdorff over their mutual love of botany. He becomes a successful court singer, but eventually learns that he is the Baron's son. Maersk is disillusioned, and repeatedly rejects the Baron's offers to legitimize him so that he can inherit the Baron's enormous estate. Suicidal, Maersk is visited by his mother's husband, who convinces him to travel to Norderney for his health.

Miss Nat-og-Dag then relates the story of the Countess Calypso: the daughter of the poet Count Seraphina, who disliked femininity, she was brought up in an abbey entirely among men, where she was ignored by everyone around her. At sixteen, she decides to chop off her own breasts, but stops herself at the last second upon seeing a painting of nymphs in the reflection of a mirror. Calypso escapes from the abbey and walks through the night, happening upon the house of Miss Nat-og-Dag, who is on her way to Norderney.

At this point, Miss Nat-og-Dag convinces the young duo to marry. With the help of the Cardinal, they complete the ceremony in the granary. The Cardinal then tells the group a parable about an encounter between Saint Peter and Barabbas in a Jerusalem inn, and the newly married couple falls asleep. At this point, the Cardinal reveals to Miss Nat-og-Dag that he is not, in fact, the Cardinal Hamilcar von Sehestedt, but his valet, Kasparson. Kasparson relates his life story to Nat-og-Dag, describing his time as an actor, a barber in Seville, a revolutionary in Paris, and a slave trader in Algiers. According to Kasparson, he is also the bastard older brother of Louis Philippe I, and killed the real Cardinal in order to take on another "role" in life. The story ends with Kasparson and Miss Nat-og-Dag kissing as water begins to enter the granary.

The story, at nearly eighty pages, is close to novella-length.

== "The Old Chevalier" ==
The narrator listens to his father's friend Baron von Brackel tell a convoluted story about an encounter with a prostitute he had in his younger years:

In 1870s Paris, the Baron is approached by a drunken girl on a rainy night, having just survived an attempt on his life through poison by his mistress, the jealous wife of a prominent Parisian statesman. The Baron and the girl, who tells him her name is Nathalie, go back to the Baron's home, he not realizing that she is a prostitute. Throughout his account, the Baron frequently digresses to discuss the changing nature of women over time, concluding, to the younger narrator: "Where we talked of woman—pretty cynically, we liked to think—you talk of women, and all the difference lies there."

The Baron and Nathalie do the usual, though with great reverence on his part, and fall asleep, after which she wakes him in the small hours, asks for twenty francs, and leaves. Too late, the Baron realizes that he loves Nathalie and chases after her, but cannot find her. The narrator asks the Baron whether he ever found her, to which he responds with a brief anecdote about visiting an artist friend nearly a decade and a half later and seeing him painting a still life of a young woman's skull—a skull which bears remarkable physical similarity to Nathalie's face.
