= Pløjeren =

Danish short story by Karen Blixen

"Pløjeren" (The Ploughman) is one of the early short stories by the Danish author Karen Blixen. Published in the journal Gads danske Magasin in October 1907 under the pen name Osceola, it followed the publication of "Eneboerne" (The Hermits) two months earlier although it was the first of the two to be written.

It tells the story of a brave young woman who discovers who she is by falling in love with a wild young man, driven by a sense of duty.

When "Pløjeren" was first published, the pen name Osceola was not generally associated with Blixen. It was probably not until 1945 that the literary historian Aage Kabell (1920–1981) mentioned the association in Dansk Forfatterleksikon.

"Pløjeren" was subsequently published in the Blixen short story collection Karneval og andre fortællinger, Gyldendal, 1994, most recently reprinted in 2010. It has not been published in English.
