= Eneboerne =

Danish short story by Karen Blixen

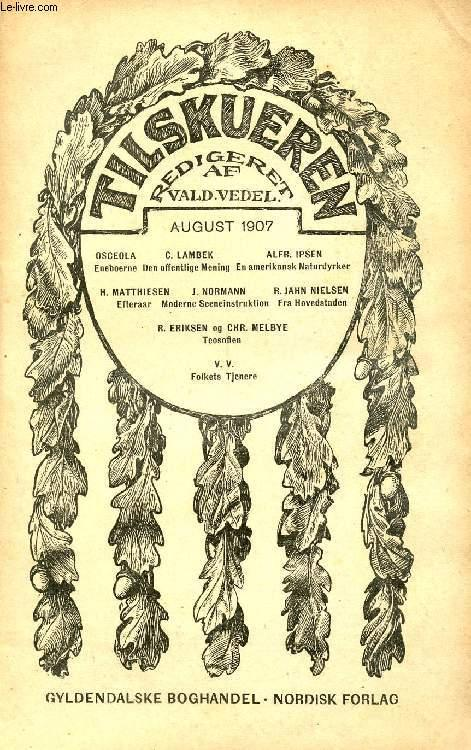
Cover of Tiskueren, August 1907, citing Osceola's "Eneboerne"

"Eneboerne" (The Hermits) is one of the early short stories by the Danish author Karen Blixen. It was published in the journal Tilskueren in August 1907 under the pen name Osceola, a famous early 19th-century Native American leader. It tells the story of Lucie and Eugène, a young couple who go to a deserted island where Eugène can better apply himself to writing a book. Increasingly isolated, Lucie is drawn into a world of dreams and the forces of nature. The ghost of a deceased army officer convinces her that her place is not on the island. Ultimately, overcome by the eternal forces of the sea, the sky and the earth, she is tempted into the ocean where she drowns.

On "Eneboerne"'s publication, Valdemar Vedel (1865–1942), the literary critic and editor of Tilskueren, recognized Blixen's talent for writing. She was not, however, ready to devote herself to a literary career at this stage, preferring to continue studying art and travelling across Europe.

When "Eneboerne" was first published, the pen name Osceola was not generally associated with Blixen although her identity was no doubt known to Vedel, the editor of Tilskueren from 1901 to 1907. It was probably not until 1945 that the literary historian Aage Kabell (1920–1981) mentioned the association in Dansk Forfatterleksikon.

"Eneboerne" was subsequently published in the Blixen short story collection Karneval og andre fortællinger, Gyldendal, 1994, most recently reprinted in 2010. It has not been published in English.
