= Rungstedlund =

Museum in Denmark

Karen Blixen Museum
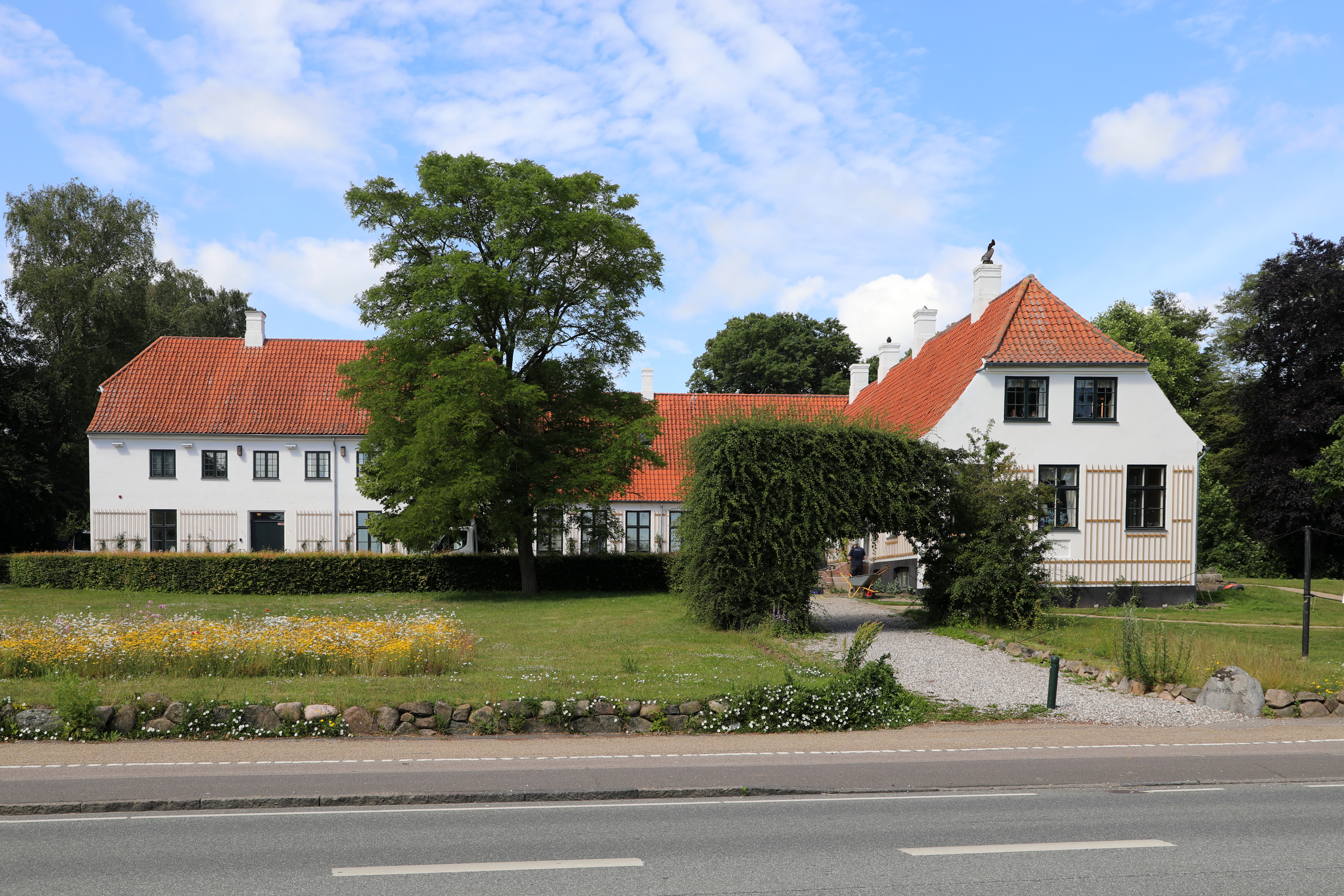
- The main building
- Established: 1991
- Location: Rungsted, Copenhagen
- Coordinates: 55°53′0″N 12°32′36″E
- Director: Tore V. Dinesen
- Public transit access: Rungsted Kyst Station
- Website: www.karen-blixen.dk

Rungstedlund, also known as the Karen Blixen Museum, is a country house in Rungsted on the Øresund coast just north of Copenhagen, Denmark, notable for its association with the author Karen Blixen, who lived there for most of her life. She was born on the estate in 1885, and returned there after her years in Kenya, chronicled in her 1937 book Out of Africa, to do most of her writings. The property is today managed by the Rungstedlund Foundation as a writer's house museum.

== History ==
The property traces its history back to 1520 when it was owned by the Crown. The oldest part of the current house dates from about 1680 when it was a combined inn and agricultural estate. Notable guests who stayed at the inn include Ludvig Holberg and Johannes Ewald. Ewald lived there from 1773 to 1775 and wrote many of his poems, including The Delights Of Rungsted. An Ode. The locale also inspired him for The ´Fishermen, a singspiele remembered for Kong Christian stod ved højen mast, the Danish royal anthem.

The inn closed in 1803. Aron David, who owned it from 1821 to 1868, merged it with the adjoining properties Rungstedgaard, Sømandshvile og Folehavegård.

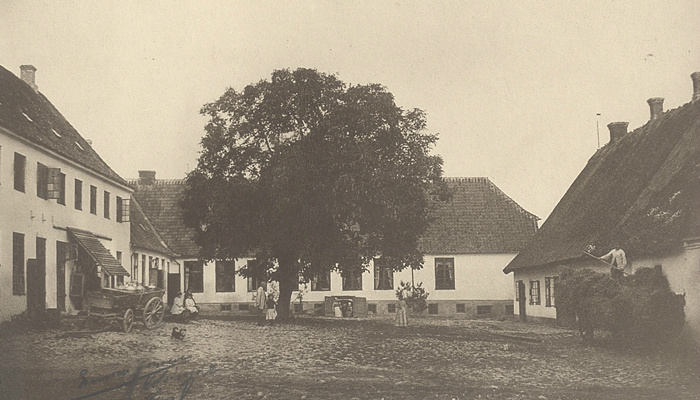
Rungstedlund in c. 1894

In 1879 the estate was purchased by Wilhelm Dinesen, father of Karen Blixen, and after his marriage to Ingeborg Westenholz in 1881 they took up residence there. At that time the estate consisted of four wings but two burned in 1898 and were never rebuilt.

Karen Blixen spent her childhood at Rungstedlund and took up residency there again after she returned from Africa in 1931. She lived there until her death in 1962 and did most of her writings in the Ewald Room. She is interred in the park.

In 1958 Karen Blixen and her siblings founded the Rungstedlund Foundation which was to own and manage the estate after her death. The Karen Blixen Museum was founded in 1991.

== Karen Blixen Museum ==
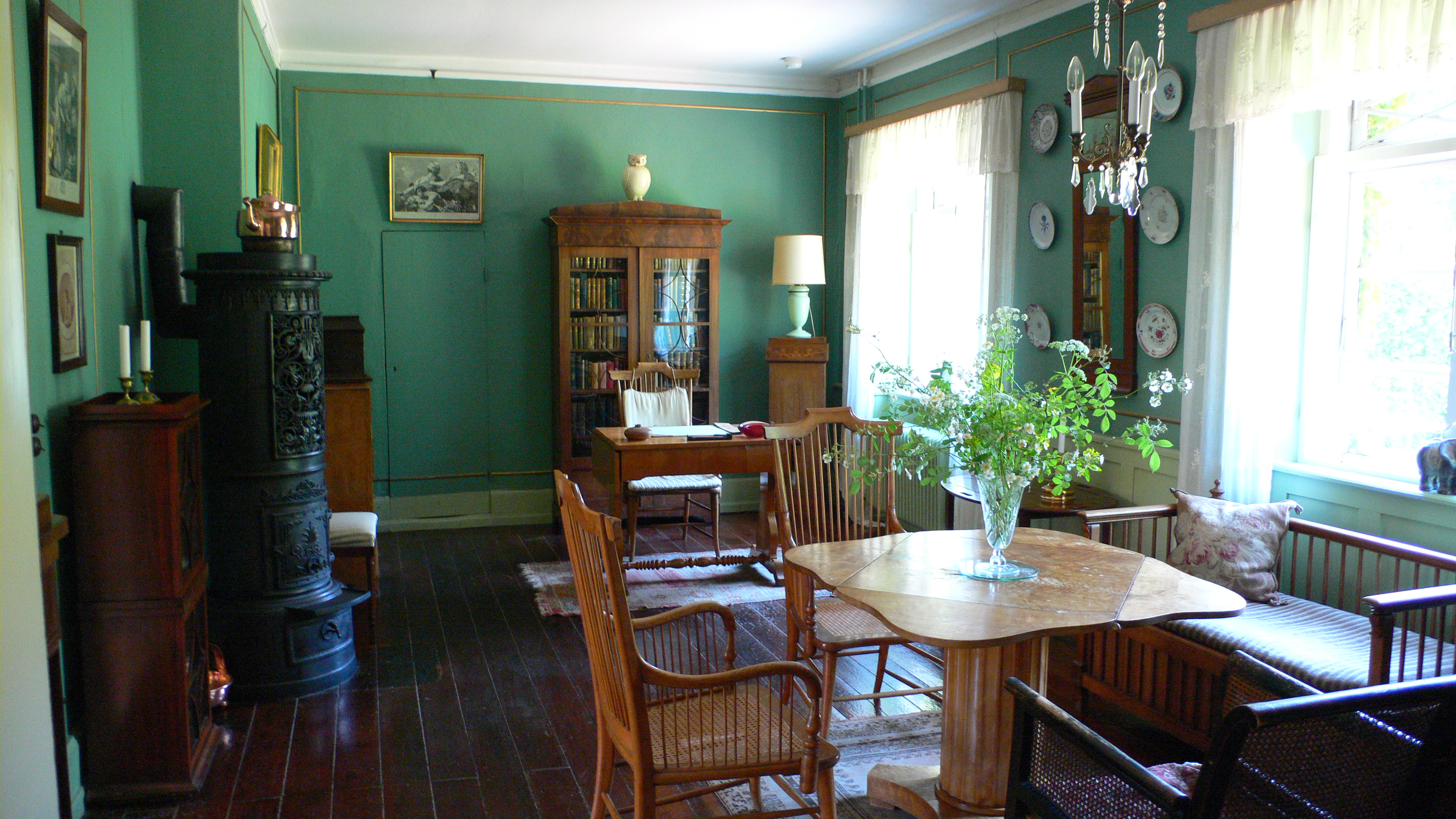
Inside the museum

Karen Blixen's home has been preserved largely unchanged with its original furniture, decor and book. The museum also features a complete collection of her oil paintings. The museum also hosts special exhibitions about the author's life and writings. In 2013 the Karen Blixen Museum joined the Nordic museum portal CultureNordic.com.

== Other uses ==
Rungstedlund is also the home of Danish Academy, which Karen Blixen co-founded in 1960 together with other Danish intellectuals. The house also hosts the award ceremony of the annual Rungstedlund Award on Karen Blixen's birthday. The grounds are used for a traditional Danish Saint John's Eve event with a bonfire and speeches.

== Rungstedlund Park ==
The park covers an area of 16.6 ha (41 acres). Most of the grounds have been laid out as a bird sanctuary. There are also flower gardens where every day during the summer season fresh flowers are cut for decorating the house.

Karen Blixen's grave is located at the foot of Ewald's Mound.

== See also ==
- Karen Blixen Museum, Kenya
- Dinesen-Motzfeldt-Hettinger Log House
