= Karen Blixen =

Danish writer (1885–1962)

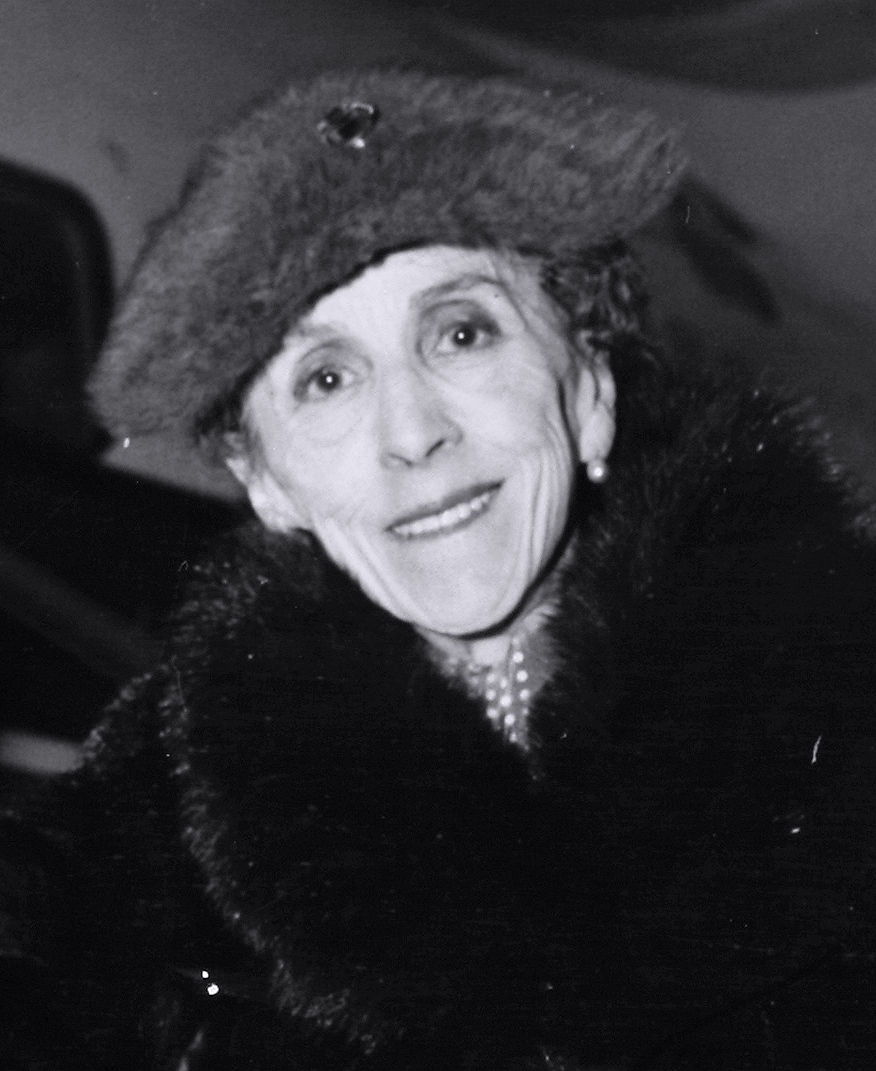
- Blixen in 1957
- Born: Karen Christentze Dinesen; 17 April 1885; Rungsted, Zealand, Denmark
- Died: 7 September 1962 (aged 77); Rungsted, Zealand, Denmark
- Occupation: Writer
- Spouse: Bror von Blixen-Finecke (m. 1914; div. 1925)
- Partner: Denys Finch Hatton
- Relatives: Ellen Dahl (sister); Thomas Dinesen (brother); Andreas Nicolai Hansen (great-grandfather); Mary Westenholz (aunt)
- Writing career
- Pen name: Isak Dinesen, Tania Blixen
- Language: English, Danish
- Notable works: Out of Africa, Seven Gothic Tales, Shadows on the Grass, Babette's Feast

Baroness Karen Christentze von Blixen-Finecke (born Dinesen; 17 April 1885 – 7 September 1962) was a Danish author who wrote in Danish and English. She is also known under her pen names Isak Dinesen, used in English-speaking countries; Tania Blixen, used in German-speaking countries; Osceola, and Pierre Andrézel.

Blixen is best known for Out of Africa, an account of her life while in Kenya, and for one of her stories, "Babette's Feast". Both have been adapted as films and each won Academy Awards. She is also noted, particularly in Denmark and the United States, for her Seven Gothic Tales. Among her later story collections are Winter's Tales (1942), Last Tales (1957), Anecdotes of Destiny (1958) and Ehrengard (1963). The latter was adapted to film in 2023 as the romantic comedy Ehrengard: The Art of Seduction.

Blixen was considered several times for the Nobel Prize in Literature, but failed to win, according to Danish reports, because of the judges' concern with perceptions of favoritism towards Scandinavian writers.

== Biography ==
=== Early life and education ===
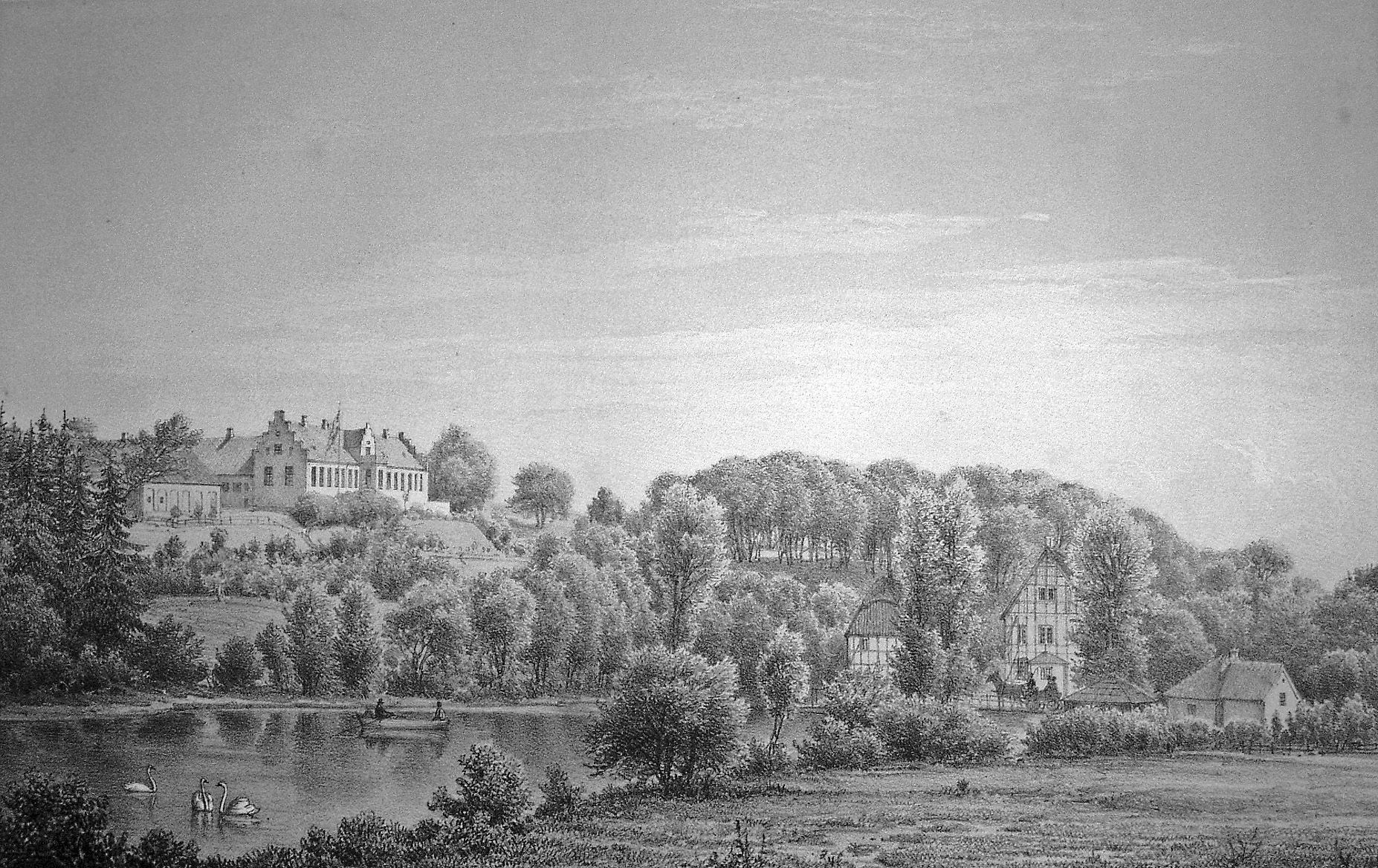
The Mattrup seat farm, 1861

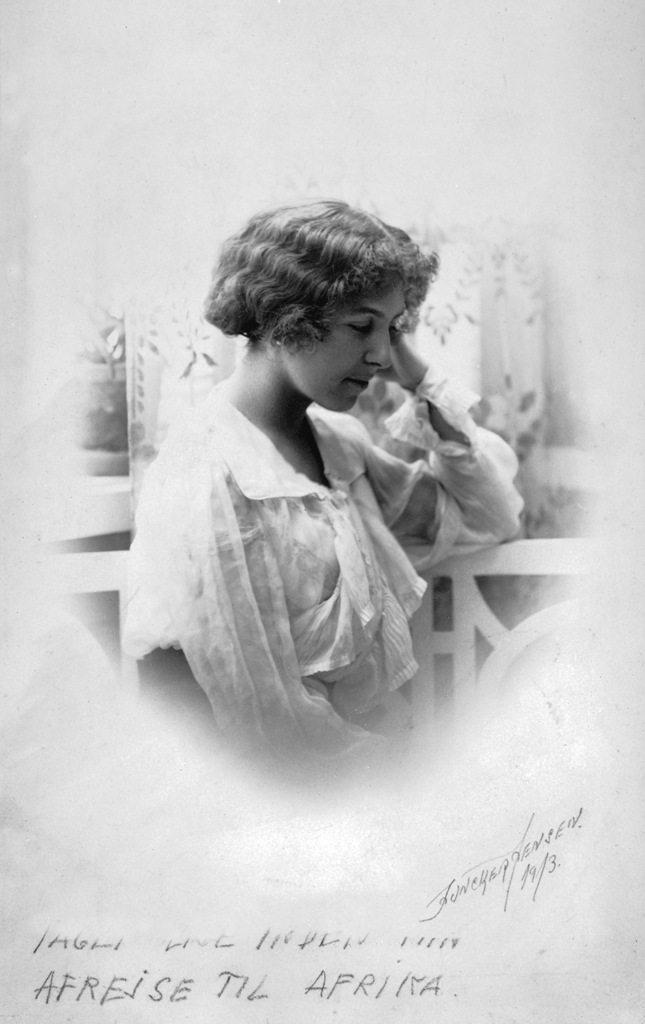
Karen Blixen photographed in 1913

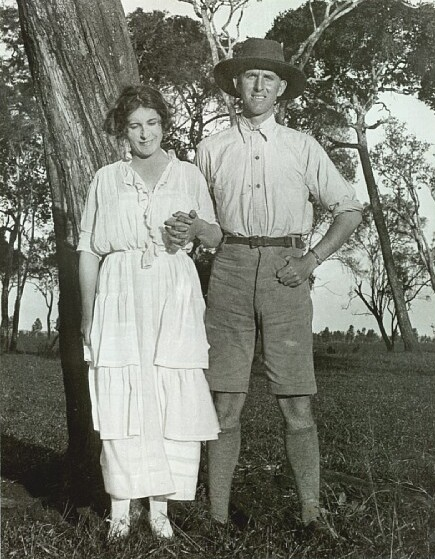
Karen Blixen with her brother Thomas on the family farm in Kenya in the 1920s

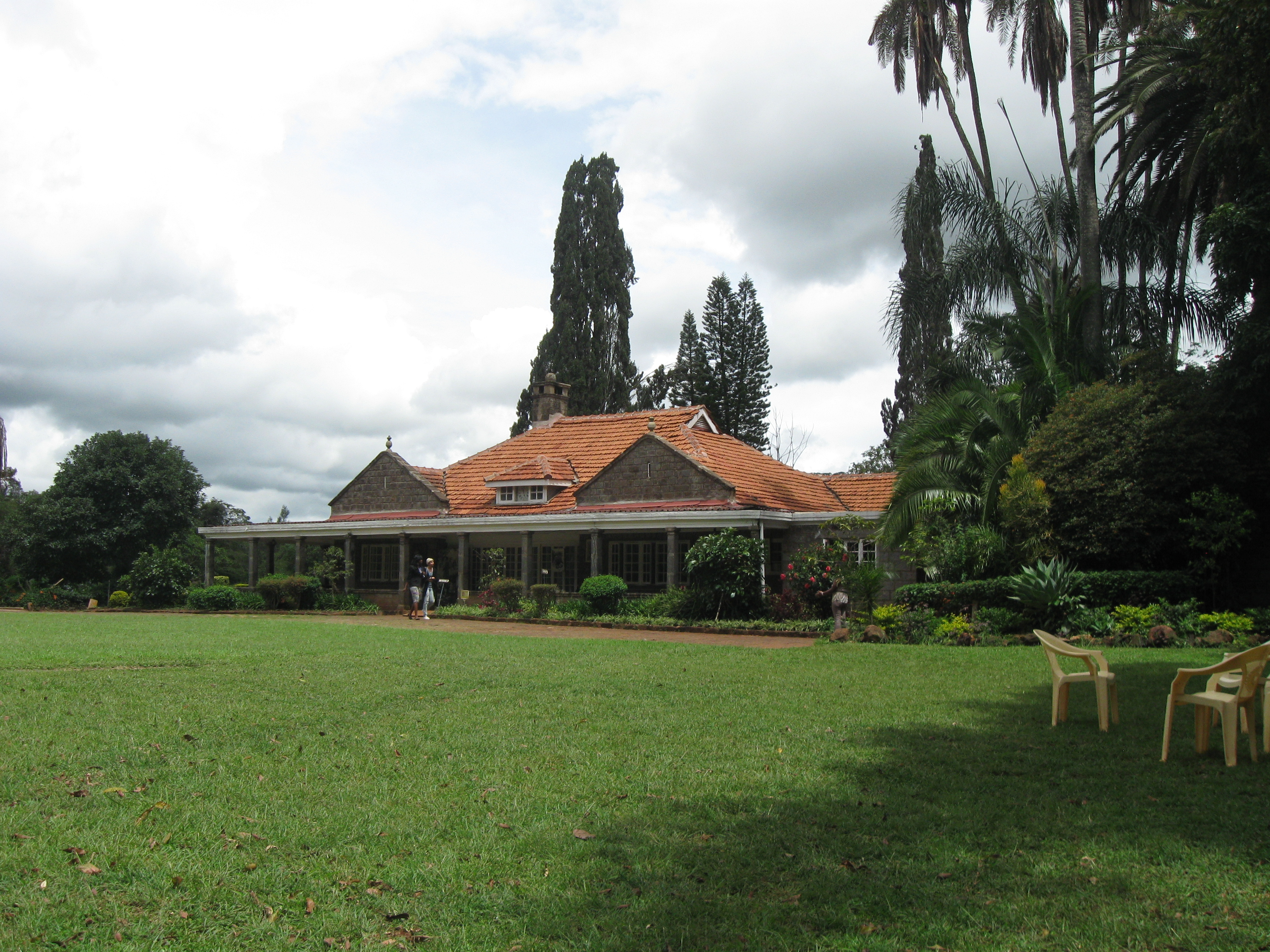
Karen Blixen's African home, now the Karen Blixen Museum

Karen Christentze Dinesen was born on 17 April 1885 in Rungstedlund, north of Copenhagen. Her father, Wilhelm Dinesen (1845–1895), was a writer, army officer, and politician. He served in the Second Schleswig War between Denmark and Prussia, and also joined the French army against Prussia. He later wrote about the Paris Commune. He was from a wealthy family of Jutland landowners closely connected to the monarchy, the established church and conservative politics. He was elected as Member of Parliament.

Her mother, Ingeborg Westenholz (1856–1939), came from a wealthy Unitarian bourgeois merchant family of ship owners. Karen Dinesen was the second oldest in a family of three sisters and two brothers. Her younger brother, Thomas Dinesen, served in the First World War and earned the Victoria Cross. Karen was known to her friends as "Tanne".

Dinesen's early years were strongly influenced by her father's relaxed manner and his love of the outdoor life and hunting. He wrote throughout his life, and his memoir, Boganis Jagtbreve (Letters from the Hunt), became a minor classic in Danish literature. While in his mid-20s, her father lived among the Chippewa Indians in Wisconsin (August 1872 to December 1873), and fathered a daughter.

On returning to Denmark, he suffered from syphilis which resulted in bouts of deep depression. He conceived a child out of wedlock with his maid Anna Rasmussen, and was devastated because he had promised his mother-in-law to remain faithful to his wife. He hanged himself on 28 March 1895 when Karen was nine years old.

Karen Dinesen's life at Rungstedlund changed significantly after her father's death. From the age of 10 years, her life was dominated by her mother's Westenholz family. Unlike her brothers, who attended school, she was educated at home by her maternal grandmother and by her aunt, Mary B. Westenholz. They brought her up in the staunch Unitarian tradition. Her Aunt Bess had significant influence on Dinesen. They engaged in lively discussions and correspondence on women's rights and relationships between men and women.

During her early years, she spent part of her time at her mother's family home, the Mattrup seat farm near Horsens. In later years she visited Folehavegård, an estate near Hørsholm that had belonged to her father's family. Longing for the freedom she had enjoyed when her father was alive, she found some satisfaction in telling her younger sister Ellen hair-raising good-night stories, partly inspired by Danish folk tales and Icelandic sagas. In 1905, these led to her Grjotgard Ålvesøn og Aud, in which her literary talent began to emerge. Around this time, she also published fiction in Danish periodicals under the pseudonym Osceola, the name of her father's dog, which she had often walked in her father's company.

In 1898, Dinesen and her two sisters spent a year in Switzerland, where she learned to speak French. In 1902, she attended Charlotte Sode's art school in Copenhagen before continuing her studies at the Royal Danish Academy of Fine Arts under Viggo Johansen from 1903 to 1906. In her mid-twenties, she also visited Paris, London and Rome on study trips.

Dinesen spent many of her holidays with her paternal cousin's family, the Blixen-Fineckes, in Skåne in the south of Sweden and fell in love with her second cousin, Baron Hans von Blixen-Finecke. When Hans did not reciprocate, she entered a relationship with his twin brother, Baron Bror Blixen-Finecke. The couple announced their engagement on 23 December 1912, to the family's surprise.

Given the difficulties both were experiencing in settling in Denmark, the family suggested they should move abroad. Karen's uncle, Aage Westenholz (1859–1935), who had made a fortune in Siam, suggested they should go to Kenya to start a coffee farm. He and his sister Ingeborg (Karen's mother) invested 150,000 Danish krone in the venture. Early in 1913, Bror left for Kenya. He was followed by his fiancée Karen in December 1913.

=== Life in Kenya, 1913–1931 ===
Soon after Dinesen arrived in Kenya, which at the time was part of British East Africa, she and Blixen were married in Mombasa on 14 January 1914. After her marriage, she became known as Baroness Blixen and she used the title until her then ex-husband remarried in 1929. Bror had attended agricultural college at Alnarp and then managed the Stjetneholm farm within the Nasbyholm estate. During her early years, Karen spent part of her time at her mother's family home, the Mattrup seat farm near Horsens. Karen and Bror planned to raise cattle on their farm, but eventually they became convinced that coffee would be more profitable. The Karen Coffee Company was established by their uncle, Aage Westerholz, who chose the name after his daughter Karen, Blixen's cousin, rather than to create an association with Karen Blixen. The couple soon established their first farm, Mbagathi, in the Great Lakes area of Kenya.

During First World War fighting between the Germans and the British in East Africa, Bror served in Lord Delamere's patrols along Kenya's border with German Tanganyika and Karen helped transport supplies. The war led to a shortage of workers and supplies. Nevertheless, in 1916, the Karen Coffee Company purchased a larger farm, Mbogani, near the Ngong Hills to the south–west of Nairobi. The property covered 6,000 acres (2,400 ha) of land: 600 acres (240 ha) were used for a coffee plantation, 3,400 acres (1,400 ha) were used by the natives for grazing, and 2,000 acres (810 ha) of virgin forest were left untouched.

The land was not well-suited for coffee cultivation, given its high elevation. The couple hired local workers: most were Kikuyu who lived on the farmlands at the time of the couple's arrival, but there were also Wakamba, Kavirondo, Swahili, and Masai. Initially, Bror worked the farm, but it soon became evident that he had little interest in it and preferred to leave running the farm to Karen while he went on safari. For the first time, English became the language she used daily. About the couple's early life in the African Great Lakes region, Karen later wrote,

Here at long last one was in a position not to give a damn for all conventions, here was a new kind of freedom which until then one had only found in dreams!

Karen and her husband were quite different in education and temperament, and Bror Blixen was unfaithful to his wife.

According to Peter Capstick, "It was not long after Blixen and his wife settled on their farm that he started womanizing." Capstick goes on to say, "His forays into town and his often wild socializing at the Muthaiga Club, coupled with a legendary indiscipline when it came to money and honoring his debts, soon gave the charming Swede a notorious reputation."

As a consequence, she was diagnosed with syphilis, according to her biographer Judith Thurman. She herself attributed her symptoms, in a letter to her brother Thomas, to syphilis acquired at 29 years old from her husband toward the end of their first year of marriage in 1915. However, although there is no doubt that she had the disease, it is believed that some of the symptoms she suffered late in life and attributed to syphilis had other causes. While in Africa she had been prescribed mercury and arsenic as treatment for syphilis and it is now believed that some of her later symptoms were the result of heavy metal poisoning.

At her farm, she also used to take care of local sick persons, including those suffering from fever, variola, meningitis and typhus.

She returned to Denmark in June 1915 for treatment with the newly discovered antibiotic Salvarsan which proved helpful. Although Karen's illness may have eventually been cured or alleviated (some uncertainty exists), it created medical anguish for years to come.

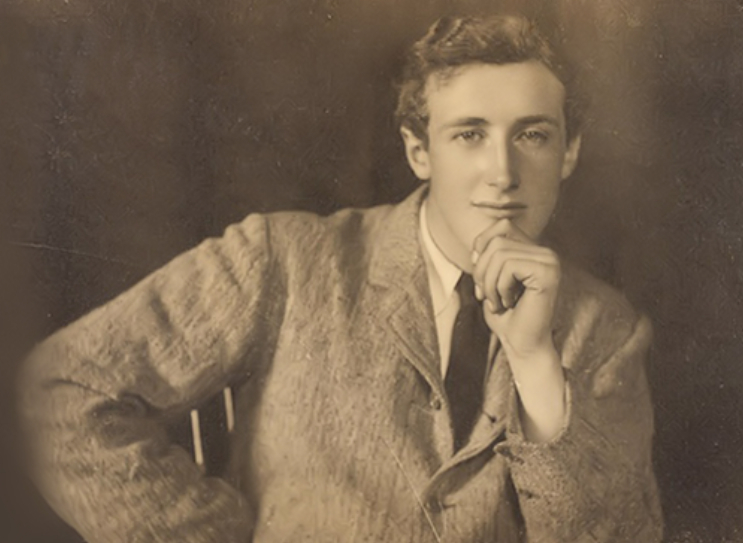
Denys Finch Hatton, around 1910–1920

On 5 April 1918, Bror and Karen were introduced at the Muthaiga Club to the English big game hunter Denys Finch Hatton (1887–1931). Soon afterwards he was assigned to military service in Egypt.

By 1919, the marriage had run into difficulties, causing her husband to request a divorce in 1920. Bror was dismissed as the farm manager by their uncle, Aage Westenholz, chair of the Karen Coffee Company, and Karen took over its management in 1921.

On his return to Kenya after the Armistice, Finch Hatton developed a close friendship with Karen and Bror. He left Africa again in 1920.

Against her wishes, Bror and Karen separated in 1921.

Finch Hatton often travelled back and forth between Africa and England, and visited Karen occasionally. He returned in 1922, investing in a land development company. After her separation from her husband, she and Finch Hatton had developed a close friendship, which eventually became a long-term love affair. In a letter to her brother Thomas in 1924, she wrote: "I believe that for all time and eternity I am bound to Denys, to love the ground he walks upon, to be happy beyond words when he is here, and to suffer worse than death many times when he leaves..." But other letters in her collections show that the relationship was unstable, and that Karen's increasing dependence upon Finch Hatton, who was intensely independent, was an issue.

Karen and Bror were officially divorced in 1925. Karen would go to Government House where she had befriended Joan Grigg, a nurse and the wife of Baron Edward Grigg, the installed Governor. Grigg would in time create a charity to create hospitals in Kenya.

Finch Hatton moved into her house, made Karen's farmhouse his home base between 1926 and 1931 and began leading safaris for wealthy sportsmen. Among his clients was Edward, Prince of Wales (the future Edward VIII). On safari with his clients, he died in the crash of his de Havilland Gipsy Moth biplane in March 1931.

She wrote about their last meeting and subsequent parting.

"When he had started in his car for the aerodrome in Nairobi, and had turned down the drive, he came back to look for a volume of poems, that he had given to me and now wanted on his journey. He stood with one foot on the running-board of the car, and a finger in the book, reading out to me a poem we had been discussing.

'Here are your grey geese,' he said.

I saw grey geese flying over the flatlands
Wild geese vibrant in the high air –
Unswerving from horizon to horizon
With their soul stiffened out in their throats –
And the grey whiteness of them ribboning the enormous skies
And the spokes of the sun over the crumpled hills.

Then he drove away for good, waving his arm to me."

At the same time, the failure of the coffee plantation, as a result of mismanagement, the high elevation of the farm, drought and the falling price of coffee caused by the worldwide economic depression, forced Karen to abandon her estate. The family corporation sold the land to a residential developer, and Karen returned to Denmark in August 1931 to live with her mother. In the Second World War, she helped Jews escape out of German-occupied Denmark. She remained in Rungstedlund for the rest of her life.

=== Life as a writer ===
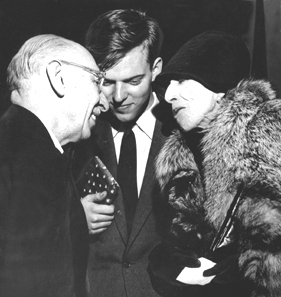
Jurij Moskvitin (middle) accompanying Blixen (right) and meeting composer Igor Stravinsky (left) at the Copenhagen City Hall, 1959

While still in Kenya, Blixen had written to her brother Thomas, "I have begun to do what we brothers and sisters do when we don't know what else to resort to, I have started to write a book. ... I have been writing in English because I thought it would be more profitable." Upon returning to Denmark, aged 46, she continued writing in earnest. Though her first book, Seven Gothic Tales, was completed in 1933, she had difficulty finding a publisher and used her brother's contacts with Dorothy Canfield to help. The book was published in the United States in 1934 under the pseudonym Isak Dinesen, though the publisher refused to give Blixen an advance and discouraged the use of a pseudonym. When it was chosen as a Book-of-the-Month Club selection, sales skyrocketed. This first book, highly enigmatic and more metaphoric than Gothic, won wide recognition in the United States, and publication of the book in the United Kingdom and Denmark followed, though with difficulty. Unable to find a translator she was satisfied with, Blixen prepared the Danish versions herself, though they are not translations, but rather versions of the stories with differing details. Blixen's explanation for the difference was that she "very much wanted it to be published in Danish as an original Danish book, and not in any — no matter how good — translation". The Danish critics were not enthusiastic about the book and were annoyed, according to Blixen, that it had first been published abroad. Blixen never again published a book in English first. All her later books were either published first in Danish, or published simultaneously in Danish and English.

Her second book, now the best known of her works, Out of Africa, was published in 1937. Its success firmly established her reputation. Having learned from her previous experience, Blixen published the book first in Denmark and the United Kingdom, and then in the United States. Garnering another Book-of-the-Month Club choice, Blixen was assured of not only sales for this new work, but also renewed interest in Seven Gothic Tales. She was awarded the Tagea Brandt Rejselegat (a Danish prize for women in the arts or academic life) in 1939. The work brought attention from critics who were concerned not only with literary appraisal of the book, but also with defining Blixen's intentions and morality. Post-colonial criticism has linked her with contemporary British writers and in some cases branded her as just another morally bankrupt white European aristocrat. Danish scholars have not typically made judgments about her morality, perhaps understanding that while colonial prejudices and elements of racism are inherent in the work, given the context and era, nevertheless her position as an outsider, a Dane and a woman makes evaluating her more complex. Some critics, including Carolyn Martin Shaw and Raoul Granqvist, have judged her to be a racist and a white supremacist, while other critics, such as Abdul R. JanMohamed, have recognized both her romanticized colonial attitudes and her understanding of colonial problems, as well as her concern and respect for African nationalists.

Five years after the publication of Out of Africa, Blixen published a collection of short stories called Winter's Tales (1942; Danish: Vinter-eventyr). A departure from her previous Gothic works, the stories reflect the starkness of the times, occupation tinged with courage and pride, and hope for the future. The stories do not reflect resistance, but resilience, and explore the interdependence of opposites. She examines shame versus pride in "The Heroine", cowardice and courage in "The Pearls", master and servant in "The Invincible Slave-Owners", and life versus death as well as freedom versus imprisonment in "Peter and Rosa". In "Sorrow-acre", the best-known story of the collection, Blixen explores victimization and oppression. Because of the war, she had to be creative about getting the manuscript published, travelling to Stockholm and meeting with employees at both the American and British embassies. The Americans were unable to ship personal items, but the British embassy agreed, shipping the document to her publisher in the United States. Blixen did not receive further communication about Winter's Tales until after the war ended, when she received correspondence praising the stories from American troops who had read them in the Armed Services Editions during the conflict.

Blixen worked on a novel she called Albondocani for many years, hoping to produce a volume in the style of Les Hommes de bonne volonté by Jules Romains, with interwoven stories across several volumes. The main character, Harun al-Rashid, was taken from One Thousand and One Nights. She worked on several collections at once, categorizing them according to their themes and whether she thought they were mostly to make money or literary. She jumped between writing the collections of stories for Albondocani to Anecdotes of Destiny to New Gothic Tales and New Winter's Tales. Almost all of Blixen's tales from the 1940s and 1950s follow a traditional style of storytelling, weaving Gothic themes such as incest and murder with myth and bewitchment as a means of exploring identity, morality and philosophy. Most also take place against the background of the 19th century or earlier periods. Concerning her deliberately old-fashioned style, Blixen mentioned in several interviews that she wanted to express a spirit that no longer existed in modern times, one of being rather than doing. Her narratives hover between skillfully crafted illusion and romanticism, with a keen knowledge of the preferred tastes of her audience. Blixen crafted her English tales in a more direct manner and her Danish tales in a 19th-century writing style which she felt would appeal more to them. Because she simultaneously worked on different collections, works written in this period were not published until almost a decade after they were originally written.

During World War II, when Denmark was occupied by the Germans, Blixen started her only full-length novel, the introspective tale The Angelic Avengers, under a French pseudonym, Pierre Andrezel, for the first and last time. Though it was written in Danish, she claimed that it was a translation of a French work written between the wars and denied being its author. The book was published in 1944 and nominated for a third Book-of-the-Month Club selection. Blixen initially did not want the book to be nominated, but eventually accepted the distinction. The horrors experienced by the young heroines have been interpreted as an allegory of Nazism, though Blixen also denied that interpretation, claiming instead that the novel was a distraction that had helped her to escape the feeling of being imprisoned by the war. In 1956, in an interview for The Paris Review, she finally acknowledged that she was the author of the novel, saying that it was her "illegitimate child". Dorothy Canfield described "The Angelic Avengers" in her Book-of-the-Month Club News review as "of superlatively fine literary quality, written with distinction in an exquisite style".

A collection of stories, Last Tales (Danish: Sidste fortællinger) was published in 1957, followed in 1958 by the collection Anecdotes of Destiny (Danish: Skæbne-Anekdoter). Last Tales included seven stories that Blixen had intended to be parts of Albondocani. It also included sections called New Gothic Tales and New Winter's Tales. Blixen's concept of the art of the story is perhaps most directly expressed in the stories "The Blank Page" and "The Cardinal's First Tale" in Last Tales. These tales feature many innuendos, which Blixen employed to force her reader into participating in the creation of the story. She mixed obscure references with explicit observation. Her writing was not just a retelling of tales, however; it was a complex layering of clues and double entendres which force the reader to deduce Blixen's intent and draw conclusions. The story, for Blixen, was vital to expression: it gives a recitation of experience, and simultaneously a potential vision of the possible.

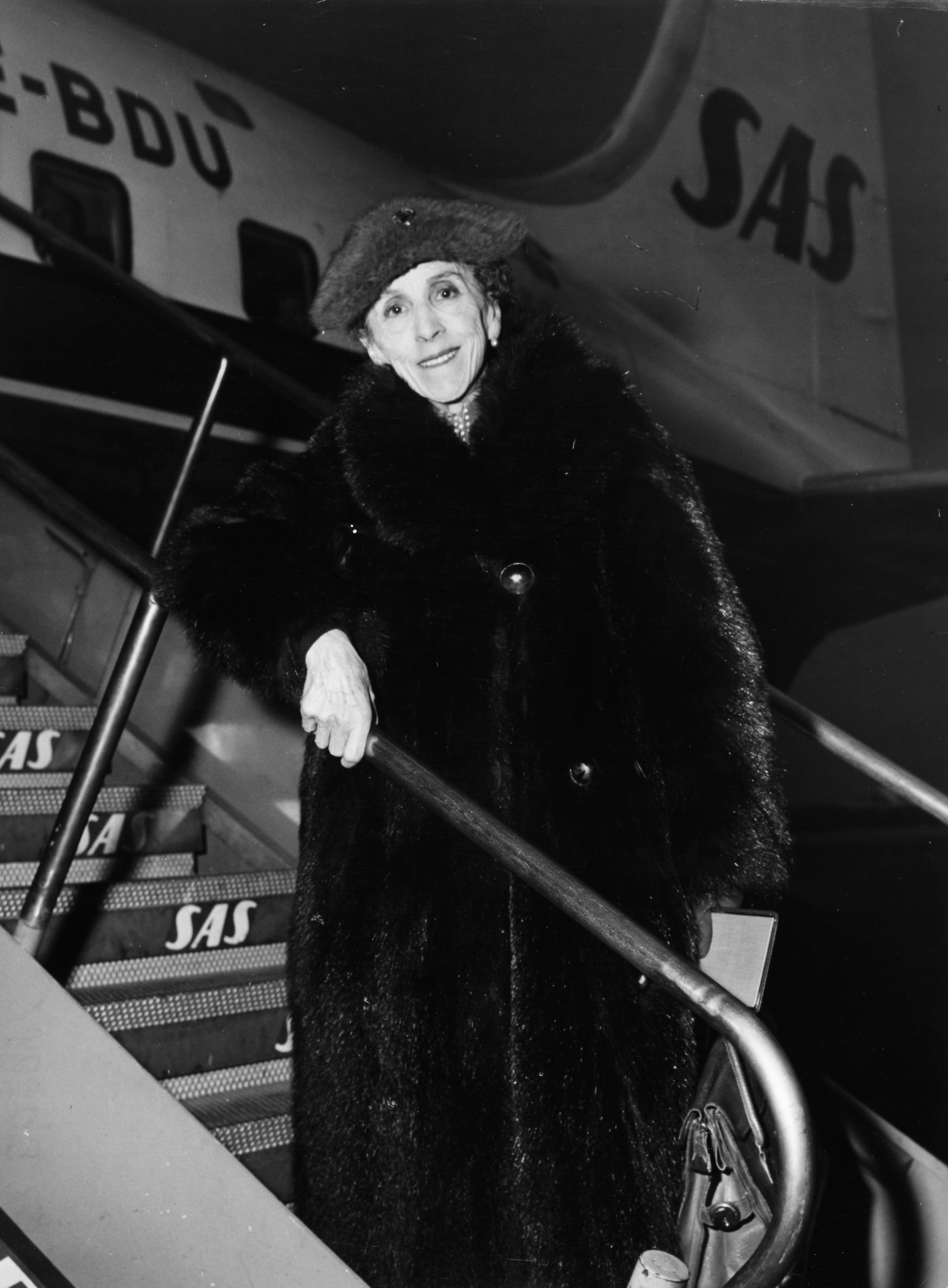
Blixen boarding an SAS flight at Kastrup Airport, Copenhagen, in 1957

Blixen planned for Anecdotes of Destiny to be a final part of the Last Tales in 1953, but as she prepared all the stories, she decided to publish Anecdotes as a separate volume. She wanted both books to appear simultaneously, but because of publication issues Anecdotes was delayed for another year. The most famous tale from Anecdotes is "Babette's Feast", about a chef who spends her entire 10,000-franc lottery prize to prepare a final spectacular gourmet meal. The story evaluates relationships and examines whether the austere but charitable life led by two sisters, in adherence to an ideal, is less true to faith than the passionate gift from the heart of their housekeeper. The story was reproduced in a film directed and written by Gabriel Axel, which was released in 1987, and won the Best Foreign Film Oscar in 1988.

In 1959, Blixen made her only trip to the United States. It was an extended trip spanning from January to April, and while the purpose was to complete a series of educational films and discussions for the Ford Foundation and Encyclopædia Britannica, Blixen intended to enjoy herself. She was the feature of a Life Magazine article in the edition of 19 January 1959 and attended two Broadway openings. Feted by the well-to-do of New York society, Blixen was invited to dine with socialites Babe Paley and Gloria Vanderbilt. She was photographed by Richard Avedon and Cecil Beaton, hosted by John Steinbeck at a cocktail party in her honor, and serenaded by Maria Callas. Nobel laureate Pearl Buck and poets E. E. Cummings and Marianne Moore came to see her, as well. When Blixen expressed a desire to meet Marilyn Monroe, the author Carson McCullers arranged a meeting with Monroe and her husband, the playwright Arthur Miller. Throughout the trip, Blixen played upon her crafted persona as a reclusive aristocrat and an outsider, but also that of an eccentric, who would eat only oysters and grapes, and drink only champagne. It was clear that she was ill, as it was reported that she was "frail" and "weighed 63 pounds [28 kg]" and she spent part of her time receiving "intravenous infusions".

After returning to Denmark, Blixen resumed working, despite severe illness, finishing the African sketches Shadows on the Grass in 1960. The last of her works published during her lifetime, it was awarded her fifth selection as a Book-of-the-Month. A return-to-Africa memoir, Shadows explores the stereotypes and labels of Europeans and Africans, concluding that "prejudices reveal more about the perceiver than the perceived". The book consists of four tales: "Shadows on the Grass", which focuses on her Somali servant Farah; "Faith is Revealed", which relays the importance of symbolism; "The Great Gesture", which depicts medical issues in her community; and "Echoes from the Hills", which evaluates her loneliness after leaving Africa and the tireless vigil her staff from Africa kept on her former home for many years.

=== Illness and death ===
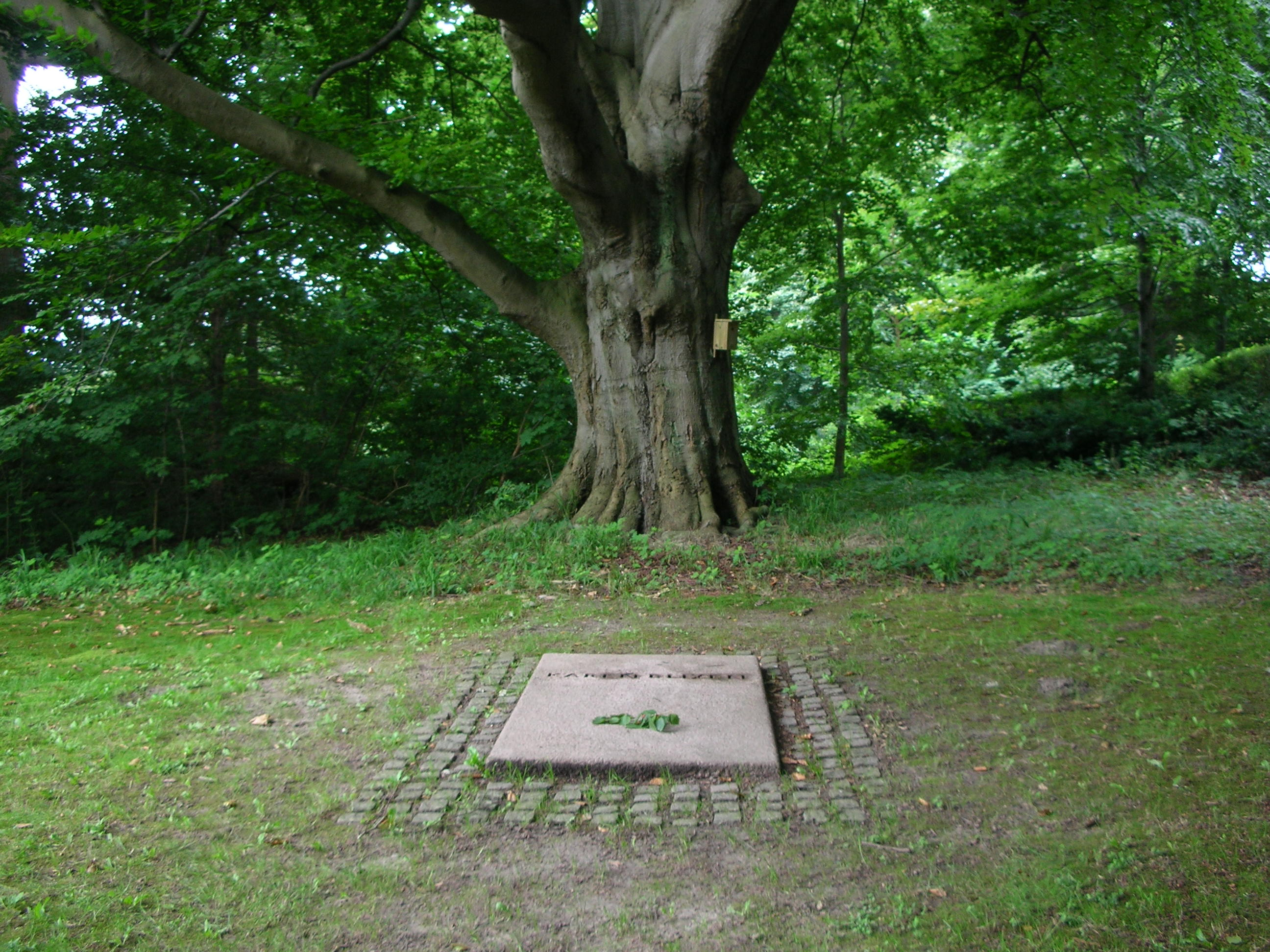
Karen Blixen's grave in Rungstedlund, Denmark

When Blixen was diagnosed with syphilis in 1915, she was treated with mercury tablets. She took approximately 1 gram of mercury per day for almost a year according to some reports, while others show she did so for only a few months. She then spent time in Denmark for treatment and was given arsenic, which she continued to take in drop form as a treatment for the syphilis that she thought was the cause of her continued pain. Blixen had reported severe bouts of abdominal pain as early as 1921, while she was still in Kenya. Several well-known physicians and specialists of both internal medicine and neurology diagnosed her with third-stage chronic syphilis. Mogens Fog, who was Blixen's neurologist, thought that her gastric problems were attributable to syphilis, in spite of the fact that blood and spinal fluid tests were negative. By the time she left Africa, Blixen was suffering from anemia, had jaundice and had overused arsenic. As clumps of her hair had begun to fall out, she took to wearing hats and turbans.

Although it was widely believed that syphilis continued to plague Blixen throughout her lifetime, extensive tests were unable to reveal evidence of syphilis in her system after 1925. Her writing prowess suggests that she did not suffer from the mental degeneration of late stages of syphilis. She did suffer a mild permanent loss of sensation in her legs that could be attributed to use of the arsenic-based anti-syphilis drug salvarsan. Her gastric pain was often called "tropic dysentery", though no stool analyses were reported in her medical records. Concerned about gaining weight, Blixen took strong laxatives "during her whole adult life", which after years of misuse affected her digestive system. She also was a heavy smoker, which when combined with her minimal food intake led to her developing a peptic ulcer.

In 1946 and 1955 the neurosurgeon Eduard Busch performed a lumbar sympathectomy on Blixen's spinal cord, but her pain returned. In 1956 when she was diagnosed with the stomach ulcer, Professor Torben Knudtzon performed surgery at Copenhagen University Hospital, but by that time, she was in her seventies, and already in poor health. Over the next several years, she continued to suffer from dehydration and a lack of nutrition, which rendered her weak and led to four additional hospitalizations at the Central Hospital in Hillerød. Late in her treatment, she finally confessed her use of laxatives to her doctors. The source of her abdominal problems remains unknown. A 1995 report published by the Danish physician, Kaare Weismann, concluded that the cause of her chronic pain and ailment was likely heavy metal poisoning. A 2002 report by Søgaard in the Danish Medical History Journal (Danish: Dansk Medicinhistorisk Årbog) attributed her misdiagnosis to a failure to communicate on both the part of Blixen and her doctors. As she didn't tell them about her laxative misuse, and the physicians believed they were fighting syphilis, each missed the opportunity for effective treatment. Both Erik Münster and Weismann also recognized the lapse in communication, as had Blixen been treated with penicillin, which was available by the 1950s, syphilis would have been able to be ruled out.

It is also known that Blixen suffered from panic attacks, because she described them in her book Out of Africa. In her analysis of Blixen's medical history, Donelson points out that Blixen wondered if her pain was psychosomatic and states that during Blixen's lifetime her illnesses were rumored to be fabricated. Her publisher indicated that Blixen's syphilis was a myth in private, but publicly, Blixen blamed syphilis for her chronic health issues. Donelson concluded: "Whatever her belief about her illness, the disease suited the artist's design for creating her own personal legend."

Unable to eat, Blixen died on 7 September 1962 at Rungstedlund, her family's estate, at the age of 77, apparently of malnutrition. Others attribute her weight loss and eventual death to anorexia nervosa.

=== Posthumous works ===
Among Blixen's posthumously published works are: Ehrengard (1962), Carnival: Entertainments and Posthumous Tales (1977), Daguerreotypes, and Other Essays (1979) and Letters from Africa, 1914–31 (1981). In the late 1960s, Orson Welles planned an anthology of Dinesen's films, in which he intended to release "The Heroine", "The Deluge at Norderney", "A Country Tale", and "Full Moon". After a day of shooting film in Budapest on "The Heroine", the project was canceled because his financier went bankrupt. The Immortal Story was adapted to film in 1968 by Welles and released simultaneously on French television and in theaters. Welles later attempted to film The Dreamers, but only a few scenes were ever completed. In 1982, Emidio Greco directed an Italian film, Ehrengard, based upon Blixen's work of the same name, which was not released until 2002 due to financial complications. A second film adaptation, Ehrengard: The Art of Seduction, was released in 2023, with creative input by Queen Margrethe II of Denmark.

== Legacy ==
=== Awards and honors ===
For her literary accomplishments, Blixen was awarded the Danish Holberg Medal in 1949, the Ingenio et Arti medal in 1952, granted the inaugural Hans Christian Andersen Scholarship of the Danish Writers Association in 1955 and received the Henrik Pontoppidan Memorial Foundation Grant in 1959. Karen Blixen was proposed by the Swedish Academy's Nobel committee to be awarded the 1959 Nobel Prize in Literature, but committee member Eyvind Johnson (who himself would accept the prize fifteen years later) opposed a prize to Blixen arguing that Scandinavians were overrepresented among Nobel prize laureates in literature, and the members of the Academy surprisingly voted for a prize to the Italian poet Salvatore Quasimodo instead. Kjell Espmark and Peter Englund, members of the Swedish Academy, have both described this decision as "a mistake", with Espmark arguing that Blixen is likely to have been better accepted internationally than other Scandinavian Nobel laureates and that the Academy missed an opportunity to correct the underrepresentation of female laureates. When Hemingway won the prize in 1954, he stated that Bernard Berenson, Carl Sandburg and Blixen deserved the prize more than he did. Although never awarded the prize, she finished in third place behind Graham Greene in 1961, the year Ivo Andrić was awarded the prize. In 2012, the 1962 Nobel records were opened after being sealed for 50 years, as is customary, and it was revealed that Blixen was among a shortlist of authors considered for the Nobel Prize in Literature, along with John Steinbeck (the eventual winner), Robert Graves, Lawrence Durrell, and Jean Anouilh. Blixen became ineligible after dying in September of that year.

Blixen's former secretary and house manager, Clara Svendsen wrote a book, Notes about Karen Blixen (Danish: Notater om Karen Blixen) in 1974, which told of the transformation of the young woman who moved to Africa into the sophisticated writer. Giving personal anecdotes about Blixen's life, Svendsen focused on the private woman behind her public image. Blixen's great-nephew, Anders Westenholz, an accomplished writer himself, wrote two books about her and her works: Kraftens horn: myte og virkelighed i Karen Blixens liv (1982) (translated into English as The Power of Aries: myth and reality in Karen Blixen's life and republished in 1987) and Den glemte abe: mand og kvinde hos Karen Blixen (1985) (The Forgotten Ape: man and woman in Karen Blixen).

Karen Blixen's portrait was featured on the front of the Danish 50-krone banknote, 1997 series, from 7 May 1999 to 25 August 2005. She also featured on Danish postage stamps that were issued in 1980 and 1996. The Asteroid 3318 Blixen was named in her honor on her 100th birthday.

On 17 April 2010, Google celebrated her 125th birthday with a Google Doodle.

The Spanish movie Karen, released in 2021, is a minimalist film about her days in Africa. Directed by María Pérez Sanz, Blixen is played by Christina Rosenvinge.

=== Rungstedlund Museum ===
Blixen lived most of her life at the family estate Rungstedlund, which was acquired by her father in 1879. The property is located in Rungsted, 24 kilometres (15 mi) north of Copenhagen, Denmark's capital. The oldest parts of the estate date to 1680, and it had been operated as both an inn and a farm. Most of Blixen's writing was done in Ewald's Room, named after author Johannes Ewald.

In the 1940s, Blixen contemplated selling the estate due to the costs of running it, but the house became a haven for a group of young intellectuals, including Thorkild Bjørnvig, Frank Jæger, Erling Schroeder, among others, who found the house as intriguing as its occupant. They began using the property as a literary salon, and it continued to be used by artists until 1991. Bjørnvig, who edited the journal Heretica, also developed a close friendship with Blixen. The house was repaired and restored between 1958 and 1960 with a portion of the estate set aside as a bird sanctuary. After its restoration, the property was deeded to the Danish Literary Academy and became managed by the Rungstedlund Foundation, founded by Blixen and her siblings. It was opened to the public as a museum in 1991. In 2013 The Karen Blixen Museum joined the Nordic museum portal.

=== Karen Blixen Museum, Nairobi ===
When Blixen returned to Denmark in 1931 from Kenya, she sold her property to a developer, Remi Martin, who divided the land into 20-acre (8.1 ha) parcels. The Nairobi suburb that emerged on the land where Blixen farmed coffee is now named Karen. Blixen herself declared in her later writings that "the residential district of Karen" was "named after me". The family corporation that owned Blixen's farm was incorporated as the "Karen Coffee Company" and the house she lived in was built by the chairman of the board, Aage Westenholz, her uncle. Though Westenholz named the coffee company after his own daughter Karen and not Blixen, the developer of the suburb named the district after its famous author/farmer rather than the name of her company.

Changing hands several times, the original farmhouse occupied by Blixen was purchased by the Danish government and given to the Kenyan government in 1964 as an independence gift. The government established a college of nutrition on the site and then when the film Out of Africa was released in 1985, the college was acquired by the National Museums of Kenya. A year later, the Karen Blixen Museum was opened and features many of Blixen's furnishings, which were reacquired from Lady McMillan, who had purchased them when Blixen left Africa. The museum house has been judged a significant cultural landmark, not only for its association with Blixen, but as a cultural representative of Kenya's European settlement, as well as a significant architectural style—the late 19th-century bungalow.

== Works ==
A considerable proportion of the Karen Blixen archive at the Royal Danish Library consists of the unpublished poems, plays and short stories Karen Dinesen wrote before she married and left for Africa. In her teens and early 20s, she probably spent much of her spare time practising the art of writing. It was only when she was 22 that she decided to publish some of her short stories in literary journals, adopting the pen name Osceola.

- Eneboerne (The Hermits), August 1907, published in Danish in Tilskueren under the pen name Osceola)
- Pløjeren (The Ploughman), October 1907, published in Danish in Gads danske Magasin, under the name Osceola)
- Familien de Cats (The de Cats Family), January 1909, published in Danish in Tilskueren under the name Osceola)
- Sandhedens hævn – En marionetkomedie, May 1926, published in Danish in Tilskueren, under the name of Karen Blixen-Finecke; an English translation by Donald Hannah titled The Revenge of Truth: A Marionette Comedy was published in Performing Arts Journal in 1986
- Seven Gothic Tales (1934 in the United States, 1935 in Denmark)
- Out of Africa (1937 in Denmark and England, 1938 in the United States)
- Winter's Tales (1942)
- The Angelic Avengers (1946)
- Last Tales (1957)
- Anecdotes of Destiny (1958) — including Babette's Feast
- Shadows on the Grass (1960 in England and Denmark, 1961 in the United States)

=== Published posthumously ===
Works published posthumously include tales Blixen previously removed from earlier collections and essays she wrote for various occasions.

- Ehrengard, a novella written in English and first published in abbreviated form as The Secret of Rosenbad in The Ladies' Home Journal in December 1962. The unabridged text was published in several languages as Ehrengard in 1963.
- Carnival: Entertainments and Posthumous Tales (1977)
- Daguerreotypes and Other Essays (1979)
- On Modern Marriage and Other Observations (1986)

=== Letters ===
Much of Blixen's correspondence has been published in Danish since her death:

- Breve fra Afrika 1914–31, two volumes (Gyldendal, 1978) — letters from Blixen
- Karen Blixen i Danmark: Breve 1931–1962, two volumes (Gyldendal, 1996) — letters to and from Blixen

The African set was translated into English as:

- Letters from Africa, 1914–1931 (University of Chicago Press, 1981)

The Danish version has since been revised and expanded, and now includes a selection of letters to Blixen:

- Karen Blixen i Afrika: en brevsamling, 1914–31, four volumes (Gyldendal, 2013)
