= Karen Blixen Museum, Kenya =

Museum in Kenya

Karen Blixen Museum
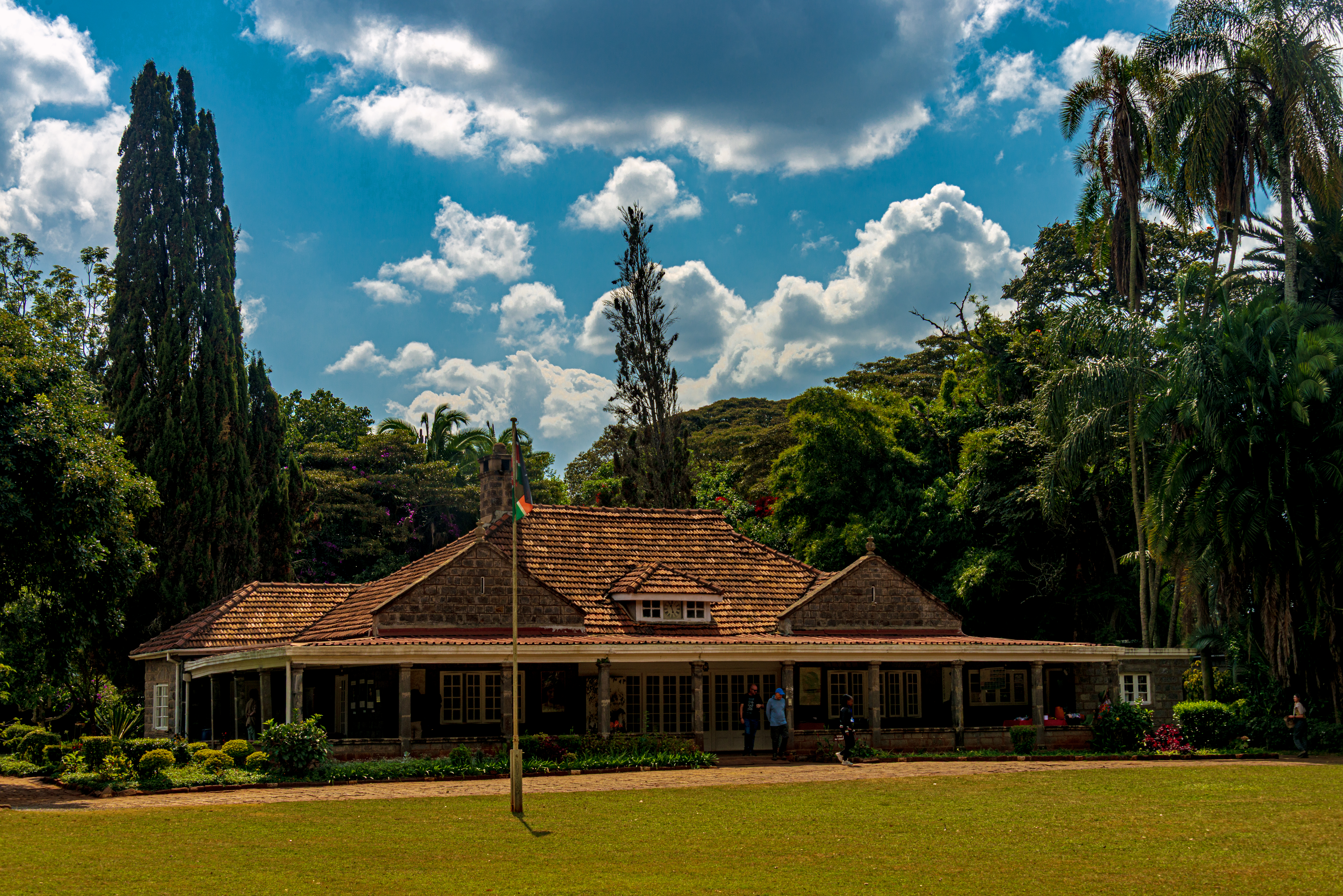
- Front view, 2025
- Established: 1986
- Location: Karen, Kenya
- Coordinates: 1.3519°S 36.7125°E
- Type: Historic house
- Architect: Åke Sjögren
- Owner: National Museums of Kenya
- Website: www.museums.or.ke/karen-blixen/

The Karen Blixen Museum, located 10 km (6.2 mi) outside of Nairobi, Kenya, "at the foot of the Ngong Hills", is the former African home of Danish author Karen Blixen, famous for her 1937 book Out of Africa which chronicles life at the estate.

== History ==
Located in what was then British East Africa, the bungalow-style house that is now the Karen Blixen Museum was built in 1912 by the Swedish engineer Åke Sjögren, The house and its attached property were bought in 1917 by Karen Blixen and her husband, Baron Bror von Blixen-Finecke with the intention of operating a coffee plantation. After the Blixens separated in 1921, Karen Blixen remained at the house and ran the plantation until she returned to Denmark permanently in 1931. Her life in Africa is chronicled in her memoir, Out of Africa, as well as in her book Shadows on the Grass.

Two years after Blixen's death in 1962, the Danish government donated it to the new Kenyan government as an independence gift. It was opened to the public in 1986 as one of Kenya's national museums, following the popularity of the 1985 film adaptation of Out of Africa. However, it was not filmed at the house, as instead the production used Blixen's nearby first farmhouse, Mbagathi, where she lived between 1914 and 1917. The upscale Nairobi suburb of Karen, created by the land re-parceling of the coffee farm after Blixen's return to Denmark, now surrounds the museum.
