= Anecdotes of Destiny =

1958 story collection by Isak Dinesen

First US edition

Anecdotes of Destiny is a collection of stories by Danish author Karen Blixen written under the pseudonym Isak Dinesen. It was the last work published during Karen Blixen's lifetime, on October 12, 1958.

Two of the stories from the collection have been adapted into films: "The Immortal Story" as the 1968 film The Immortal Story (directed by Orson Welles), and "Babette's Feast" as the 1987 Danish film Babette's Feast (directed by Gabriel Axel).

Vintage Books reissued Anecdotes of Destiny and the novella Ehrengard in one volume in 1985 and again in 1993. Since the release of Axel's film, the collection has sometimes been reissued under the name of its now best-known story, for example as Babette's Feast and Other Stories by Penguin Books in 2013.
