= Ellen Dahl =

Danish writer and philanthropist

Ellen Alvilde Dahl (née Dinesen 13 September 1886 – 17 February 1959) was a Danish writer and philanthropist. She was the younger sister of Karen Blixen, and the daughter of Captain Wilhelm Dinesen and Ingeborg Dinesen. She wrote under the pseudonym Paracelsus, which referenced the Swiss doctor Theophrastus Bombast von Hohenheim (1493-1541).

In 1916 she was married to lawyer Knud Dahl (1876-1945).

She brought her brothers share in Rungstedlund and donated it to Rungstedlundfonden, the organisation that are in charge of the Karen Blixen Museum. This made it possible that Karen Blixen's home could be preserved.

== Bibliography ==
Under the pseudonym Paaracelsus:

- "Parabler" (Gyldendalske Boghandel, 1928)
- "Introductioner" (C.A Reitzels Forlag, 1931).

Under her own name:

- "Vejrkalender"
- "Dansk Billedbog" (Berlingske Forlag, 1941).
