= Thomas Dinesen =

Danish recipient of the Victoria Cross (1892 –1979)

Thomas Fasti Dinesen VC
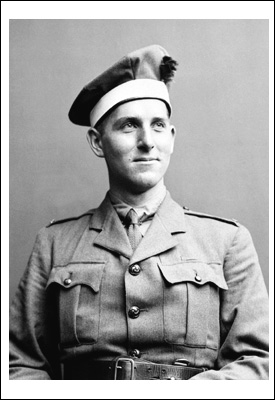
- Dinesen in the uniform of the Black Watch of Canada
- Born: 9 August 1892; Rungsted, Denmark
- Died: 10 March 1979 (aged 86); Vejle, Denmark
- Burial place: Hørsholm Churchyard, Hørsholm, Denmark
- Relatives: Karen Blixen (sister); Ellen Dahl (sister); Andreas Nicolai Hansen (great-grandfather); Mary Westenholz (aunt)
- Military career
- Allegiance: Canada
- Branch: Canadian Expeditionary Force
- Service years: 1917–1918
- Rank: Lieutenant
- Units: 42nd Infantry Battalion, CEF
- Conflicts: First World War
- Awards: Victoria Cross; Croix de guerre (France); Order of Dannebrog (Denmark); Pro Benignitate Humana Medal (Finland)

Thomas Fasti Dinesen VC (9 August 1892 – 10 March 1979) was a Danish recipient of the Victoria Cross, the highest and most prestigious award for gallantry in the face of the enemy that can be awarded to British and Commonwealth forces. He was the younger brother of the author Karen Blixen (who used the pen name Isak Dinesen).

== Details ==
He was born in an affluent and landed (but bourgeois rather than aristocratic) family in Rungsted, Denmark. Following the outbreak of the First World War, Dinesen attempted to enlist in the British, French, and United States armies, before finally being accepted by the Canadian Corps in 1917. He enlisted in the 236th Battalion (New Brunswick Kilties), CEF before transferring to the 42nd Battalion, Canadian Expeditionary Force: the Royal Highlander Regiment, known as the Black Watch of Canada. The MacLean Kilties were the 236th Canadian Battalion, recruited in Nova Scotia. It reached England in 1917 and was broken up for reinforcements.

During the Battle of Amiens he was 26 years old, and a private in the 42nd Quebec Regiment (Royal Highlanders of Canada) Battalion, Canadian Expeditionary Force when, on 12 August 1918 at Parvillers, France, he displayed conspicuous bravery when, five times in succession, he rushed forward alone against entrenched enemy troops and put hostile guns out of action. He was credited with killing 12 of the enemy using both bayonet and grenade, and with inspiring his comrades at a very critical stage of the action.

For this action, Dinesen was awarded the Victoria Cross (VC). He also received the French Croix de guerre. His name appears on the List of Canadian Victoria Cross recipients.

He was commissioned and later achieved the rank of lieutenant.

On 7 August 1918, whilst waiting to go into action, Dinesen wrote of his night in Gentelles Wood: 'All day long we rested in this pleasant spot – we even had permission to make a little fire here and there under a thickly branched tree and do a bit of cooking. The regular meals are good and plentiful, of course, but we never miss a chance of eating unlimited quantities of extra food. The last tin of baked beans was opened – there's no reason to go into battle with a haversack heavier than was absolutely necessary! We washed and shaved carefully in order to look our best before Fritz ... Our equipment was inspected for the last time: Gas-masks, rifles, ammunition, shaving kit, iron rations – everything was OK. Some of us were presented with an extra gift – mine was a big and heavy bag containing a dozen or so Mills bombs! Just before sunset we had to fall in for a final parade. Then supper – and at 10pm we were again fighting our way through the throng on the Amiens–Roye road.'

Thomas's sister, the famous Danish author Karen (whom he, and most of their Danish friends, called "Tanne"), later wrote that her brother's bravery, and the recognition from the British Crown, in some measure saved her own reputation in the community of British colonials among whom she lived in British East Africa. According to Blixen, she had inadvertently alienated many of her neighbors by helping to buy horses for a German officer she met on board ship while sailing to Kenya for the first time. Only months later this officer, General Paul Emil von Lettow-Vorbeck, was named commander of the German forces in East Africa, and waged an effective campaign against Blixen's English neighbors. Blixen commented that the suspicion and resentment this aroused in her fellow colonists only subsided after her brother won the VC.

== Life after the war ==
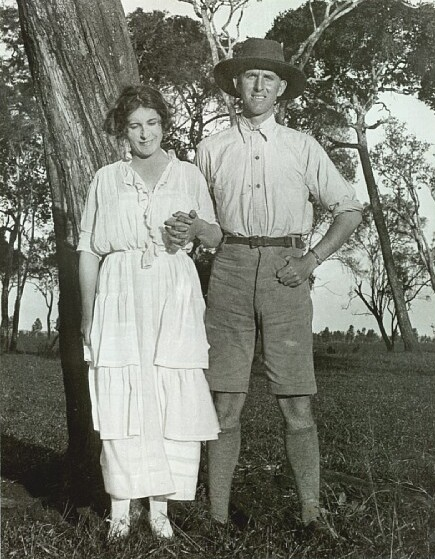
Karen Blixen with her brother Thomas Dinesen on the family farm in Kenya in the 1920s.

In 1918, Thomas Dinesen moved to British East Africa to help his sister manage her coffee farm in the Ngong hills southwest of Nairobi. He was his mercurial sister's most reliable confidant. He designed and largely built the farm's coffee-roasting plant (which later burned down). Early in 1923, Thomas left the colonial life and returned to Denmark.

In his later years he took up writing, and wrote a number of books in Danish. The best known is Tanne, about his famous sister. In 1929 he published the book No man's land: En dansker med canadierne ved vestfronten. It was translated into English in 1930 under the title Merry Hell!: A Dane with the Canadians. The book describes his troublesome way to the Western Front as well as the events that won him the VC.

He died in 1979. He is buried in Hørsholm Churchyard, Hørsholm, Denmark. His VC and other medals are held in the Lord Ashcroft VC collection in the Imperial War Museum.
