= Tilskueren =

Danish cultural magazine (1884–1939)

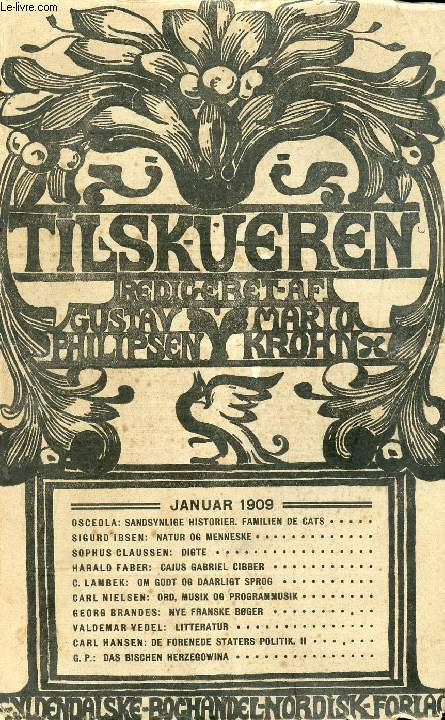
- Cover page dated January 1909
- Editor: Valdemar Vedel; Poul Levin; Axel Garde
- Categories: Cultural magazine; Literary magazine
- Frequency: Monthly
- Founder: Niels Neergaard
- Founded: 1884
- Final issue: 1939
- Country: Denmark
- Based in: Copenhagen
- Language: Danish
- OCLC: 1767496

Tilskueren (Danish: The Spectator) was a monthly cultural and literary magazine published in Copenhagen, Denmark, between 1884 and 1939. It was continuation of another magazine, Det nittende Aarhundrede (Danish: the Nineteenth Century), which was founded by Georg and Edvard Brandes. The subtitle of Tilskueren was Maanedsskrift for Litteratur, Samfundsspørgsmaal og almenfattelige videnskabelige Skildringer (Danish: Monthly for Literature, Public Matters, and Popular Scientific Descriptions).

== History and profile ==
Tilskueren was established in 1884. The founder and first editor was Niels Neergaard, future prime minister of Denmark. The magazine had its headquarters in Copenhagen. Tilskueren significantly influenced the Finnish cultural magazine, Valvoja.

Georg Brandes, Martinus Galschiøt and Johannes Jørgensen were among the contributors. Johannes Jørgensen who would launch an arts and literary magazine in October 1893, namely Taarnet, published a manifesto on his approach towards symbolism in the magazine in September 1891. Tilskueren also contained the articles by Jørgensen on Charles Baudelaire and Edgar Allan Poe among others. Several short stories by Karen Blixen were first published in the monthly. Tom Kristensen started his career as a literary reviewer and critic in Tilskueren in May 1923. An excerpt from Amalie Skram's first novel, Constance Ring, was published in the magazine in 1885. Paul Gauguin's exhibition in Copenhagen's Frie Udstilling exhibition hall in March 1893 was positively reviewed in the magazine by Karl Madsen.

Valdemar Vedel and Poul Levin served as the editors of the magazine. From 1930 to 1939 the magazine was edited by Axel Garde. In 1939 the magazine ceased publication.

== See also ==
- List of magazines in Denmark
