= List of historic houses in metropolitan Copenhagen =

This list of historic houses in metropolitan Copenhagen provides an overview of historic houses in metropolitan Copenhagen, Denmark.

Listed building
Demolished building

== Central Copenhagen ==
=== City centre ===
Name	Image	Location	Coordinates	Description	Ref.				
Amalienborg		Frederiksstaden	1760		Ref				
Barchmann Mansion		City centre	1742						
Bellahøj		Frederiksstaden	Bellahøjvej 20, Brønshøj		Former farmhouse(country house.	-	Brøste House	Christianshavn	1892
Charlottenborg Palace		Town house	1677						
Dag Hammarskjölds Allé 26		Dag Hammarskjölds Allé 26		Town mansion built for Franz Nordstrand to designs by Albert Oppenheim.					
Dag Hammarskjölds Allé 28		Dag Hammarskjölds Allé 28		Town mansion built for Harald Simonsen to designs by Carl Brummer.					
Dehn Mansion		Frederiksstaden	1756						
Erichsen Mansion			1801		Ref				
Gustmeyer House		City centre	1797						
Hagemann Mansion		City centre	1918						
Hansen Mansion		Town house	1836						
Harsdorff House		City centre	1780						
Holstein Mansion		City centre	1687		Ref				
Kommandantboligen at Rosenborg		City centre	1763						
Lille Mølle									
Lindencrone Mansion			1753						
Mathias Hansen House		Town house	1702						
Møinichen Mansion		City centre	1733						
Moltke Mansion		Frederiksstaden	1702						
Odd Fellows Mansion		Frederiksstaden	1755						
Ploug House		City centre	1799						
Prince William Mansion		Frederiksstaden	1751						
Prince's Mansion		City centre	1744						
Stanley House		Town house	1756						
Steinfass House		Christianshavn	1771						
Thott Mansion		City centre	1686						
Yellow Mansion		City centre	1764						

=== Frederiksberg ===
Name	Image	Location	Coordinates	Description
Bakkehuset		Frederiksberg	1520s	Former country house and inn.
Boye June's Country House				Former country house.
Frederiksberg Palace		Frederiksberg		Former royal summer retreat from 1800 with later extension.
Ludvigs Minde				Former country house.
Lykkesholm				House from 1865.
Møllmann's Country House				House from 1865.
Nøjsomhed				Former country house.
Ny Bakkegård				House from 1865.
Rolighed		Frederiksberg		Former country house from c. 1770.
Sankt Thomas		Country house		Former country house.
Sans Souci		Country house		Former country house.
Sindshvile		Country house		Former country house.
Svanemosegård		Åboulevard (Ladegårdsvek 7)		Country house from the 1659s. It was demolished in 1884.
Store Godthåb		Frederiksberg		Former country house from c. 1770.
Vodroffsgård		Vodroffsvej		
Vodroffsvej 10				House from 1865.

=== Amager ===
Name	Image	Location	Coordinates	Description
Kastrupgård				Former manor house.
Sans Souci				Villa built for the founder of Eberts Villaby.

=== Nørrebro ===
Name	Image	Location	Coordinates	Description
Blågård		Blågårds Plads		Former royal country house.
Ewaldsgade 5				Former home of Niels Sigfred Nebelong built to his own design in 1853.
Ewaldsgade 7				Former home of Johan Daniel Herholdt built to his own design in 1863.
Petersdal				Former country house.
Solitude		Solitudevej		Former country house.
Ventegodt				Former country house.

=== Østerbro ===
Name	Image	Location	Coordinates	Description
Carl Aagaard House				House from 1875 designed by Vilhelm Dahlerup.
Christianshvile				House from 1863.
Edvard Brandes House				House built for Edvard Brandes in 1902-03 to designs by Rugen Jørgensen.
Ehlersvej 17				House designed by Frits Schlegel.
Gammel Vartovvej 22				House from 1920 designed by Aage Rafn.
J. F. Willumsen House				Home and studio of Jens Ferdinand Willumsen, completed in 1907 to his own design
Kristianiagade 1				House built for Otto Benzon in 1897 to designs by Andreas Clemmensen.
Kristianiagade 5				House built for Otto Mønsted in 1898 to designs by Andreas Clemmensen.
Kristianiagade 7				House built in 1898 to designs by Johan Schrøder.
Krøyer House				House built for Peder Severin Krøyer to designs by Ulrik Plesner.
Kommandantboligen at Kastellet				Former residence of the commandant of Kastellet.
Lundevangsvej 12				House built for a lawyer to an Art Nouveau design by Carl Brummer.
P. C. Skovgaard House				House built for the painter P. C. Skovgaard in 1972 to a design by Johan Daniel Herholdt.
Rolighed)		Country house		Country house with Hans Christian Andersen associations.
Rosendal)		Æsterbrogade		Country house with Hans Christian Andersen associations.
Svanemøllevej 41				House built for Valdemar Ludvigsen in 1911 to designs by Carl Brummer.
Svanemøllevej 56				House built for Ivar Knudsen in 1904 to designs by Carl Brummer.

=== Valby ===
Name	Image	Location	Coordinates	Description
Karens Minde		Wagnersvej 19, 2450 København SV		Former country house.
Antoinettevej 1				House built for the lawyer Carl Meyer from a design by Ylrik Plesner in 1908.

=== Vesterbro/Kongens Enghave ===
Name	Image	Location	Coordinates	Notes
Carl Jacobsen House		Vesterbro		Former home of Carl Jacobsen built to designs by Gack Kampmann.
Mariaslyst		Vesterbrogade		Former country house.

== Suburbs ==
=== Gentofte Municipality ===
Name	Image	Location	Coordinates	Description
Villa Adelaide		Ordrup Park		Country house built for Jacob Heinrich Moresco in 1871. It was demolished in 1969.
Belvedere				Former country house from 1842. It was adapted in 1889.
Bernstorff Palace				Former royal residence from 1756.
Blidah		Strandvejen		Former country house.
Bonne Esperence				Former country house.
Charlottenlund Palace		Country house	1881	Former royal residence from 1731. It was adapted by Ferdinand Meldahl in 1881.
Christiansholm		Klempenborg		Former country house from 1746.
Femvejen 2		Femvejen		Former home of architect Georg Jensen built to his own design in 1934.
Gammel Vartov		Strandvejen		Former country house.
Villa Hasa		Ordrup Park		House built for Harald Valdemar Mansfeld-Büllnerin 1909 to an Osmanic Tevival style design by A. O. Leffland. It was demolished in 1938.
Kai Nielsen House		Ordrup		Former home of sculptor Kai Knielsen built to a design by Ivar Bentsen in 1914.
Hellerupgård		Hellerup		Country house from 1792-93 designed by Joseph-Jacques Ramée.
Heslegård		Bernstorfsvej		
Haslehøj				Former country house.
Hvidøre				Villa from 1871 designed by Johan Schrøder.
Lille Bernstorff				House.
Maglegård		Strandvejen		Former country house.
Øregård				Country house byult for Johannes Søbøtker in 1806 to a Neoclassical design by Joseph-Jacques Ramée.
Ordrupgaard		Ordrup		House built in 1816-18 to designs by Gotfred Tvede.
Rydhave				Former country house from 1775. Now used as the official residence of the American ambassador.
Schæffergården				Former country house.
Søholm				Country house from 1809 designed by Christian Frederik Gansen.
Sølyst				Former country house.
Store Taffelbay				Former country house.
Vilhelmsdal		Strandvejen		Country house designed by Christian Frederik Hansen.

=== Gladsaxe Municipality ===
Name	Image	Location	Coordinates	Description
Aldershvile				Former country house.
Haraldsgave				Former country house.
Mørkhøjgaard		Mørkhøj Bygade 19, 2860 Søborg		Former country house.
Nybrogård				Former country house.

=== Hørsholm Municipality ===
Name	Image	Location	Coordinates	Description	
Christiansgave					
Eiler Rasmussen House		Dreyersvej 9, 2960 Rungsted Kyst		Steen Eiler Rasmussen's own house.	
Folehavegård		Folehavevej 125A, 2970 Hørsholm			
Hirschholm Slot		Hørsholm			
Fuglsangshus		Gl Hovedgade 2, 2970 Hørsholm			
Mortenstrupgård		Mortenstrupvej 75, 2970 Hørsholm			
Nebbegård					
Halldor Gunnløgsson House		Rungsted Strandvej 68, 2970 Hørsholm			
Kokkedal House		Kokkedal Alle 6, 2970 Hørsholm			
Rungstedlund					
Smidstrup House		Strandvejen			Gothic Revival style country house constructed for Waldemar Tully Oxholm to designs by C. V. Nielsen.
Smidstrupgård					
Smidstrupøre		Country house			
Smidstrupørevej 8, 2960 Rungsted Kyst					
Sophienberg				Former royal summer residence from 1744–46 designed by Niels Eigtved.	

=== Lyngby-Taarbæk Municipality ===
Name	Image	Location	Coordinates	Description
Bøgely		Raadvad 2, 2800 Kongens Lyngby		
Brede House		Hummeltoftevej 185, 2830 Virum		
Villa Brinken		Taarbæk Strandvej		Otto Benzon's former summer residence from 1894.
Frederiksdal		Country house		
Christianelyst		Nybrovej 393, 2800 Kongens Lyngby		
Frieboeshvile		Lyngby Hovedgade 2A, 2800 Kongens Lyngby		
Gammel Rustenborg		Rustenborgvej 1		
Gramlille		Lyngby Hovedgade 28, 2800 Kongens Lyngby		
Hegnslund		Strandvejen 859, 2930 Klampenborg		
Marienborg		Nybrovej 410, 2800 Kongens Lyngby		
Ørholm		Ørholmvej 61, 2800 Kongens Lyngby		
Sophienholm		Nybrovej 401, 2800 Kongens Lyngby		
Spurveskjul		Spurveskjul 4, 2830 Virum		
Sorgenfri Palace		Kongevejen 2A, 2800 Kongens Lyngby		
Sorgenfridal				
Tusculum				

=== Rudersdal Municipality ===
Name	Image	Location	Coordinates	Description
Aggershvile		Strandvejen		Former country house.
Alexandria		Strandvejen		Former country house.
Bakkehuset		Vedbæk Strandvej 373		Country house built for stockbroker Johan Levin to designs by Carl Brummer.
Bel Colle		Rungsted		Country house built for businessman Valdemar Glückstadt.
Birkeborg				Country house from 1909-10 designed by Carl Brummer. It was demolished in 1077.
Carlsminde		Søllerødvej 30		Country house from the late 18th century.
Cathrinelyst		Vilhelm La Cours Vej 7, 3460 Birkerød		Former home of Wilhelm la Cour.
Countess Danner Mansion		Skodsborg		Former summer residence of Countess Danner.
Enrum		Vedbæk Strandvej 341		Country house from 1864 designed by Johan Daniel Herholdt.
Fredensdal		Kildevej 8, Holte		Country house from 1824.
Frederikslund		Frederikslundsvej 21		Country house from 1802 designed by Joseph-Jacques Ramée.
Frydenlund		Frydenlunds Allé 9-21, Rudersdal		Country house from the 1790s attributed to Jørgen Henrich Rawert, incorporating elements from a hunting lodge from the 1720s by Johan Cornelius Krieger. The Three-winged building was restored by Carl Brummer in 1907–09+9-
Gammel Holtegård		Country house		Country house built by Lauritz de Thurah in 1766 for his own use.
Henriksholm		Vedbæk		Former country house.
Kaningården				Former country house.
Manziusgården		Mantzius Johan Mantzius Vej 7A 3460 Birkerød.		Former country house named for Johan Manzius.
Middelboe House				Jørn Utzon-designed house.
Mothsgården		Country house		Four-winged farmhouse/country house from the 18th century.
Nærumgård				Former country house.
Næsseslottet				Country house by Andreas Kirkerup.
Olufshøj		Søllerødvej 40, 2840 Holte		Country house from the late 18th century.
Rolighed				Former country house. The present building is from 1927.
Søllerød Slot				Former country house.
Sjælsølund		Vedbæk Strandej 321		Country house built in 1915 for tobacco manufacturer E. Nobel to designs by Gerhard Rønne.
Sølyst		Vedbæk Strandej 321		Country house built in c. 1850 for chamberlain Gyldenstierne Sehested to designs by Niels Sigfred Nebelong.

== Surroundings ==
=== Egedal Municipality ===
Name	Image	Location	Coordinates	Description
Edelgave				
Melchiors Enkesæde				

=== Fredensborg Municipality ===
Name	Image	Location	Coordinates	Description
Fredensborg Palace		Fredensborg		
Krogerup		Humlebæk		
Louisiana				Former country house.

=== Frederikssund Municipality ===
Name	Image	Location	Coordinates	Notes	Description
Jægerspris Castle		Jægerspris			
Selsø					
Svanholm					

=== Furesø Municipality ===
Name	Image	Location	Coordinates	Description
Farumgård		Søvej 8, 3520 Farum		Manor house from 1756.

=== Gribskov Municipality ===
Name	Image	Location	Coordinates	Description
Fiskerhuset		Østergade 10, 3250 Gilleleje		Fisherman's House from the late 18th century which was adapted in 1868.
Munkeruphus		Munkerup Strandvej 78, 3120 Dronningmølle		Country house from 1916.
Rågegården		Rågeleje Strandvej 1A, 3210 Vejby		Country house from 1915 designed by Povl Baumann.
Strandvejen 20		Strandvejen 20, 3220 Tisvildeleje		

=== Halsnæs Municipality ===
Name	Image	Location	Coordinates	Description
Arresødal				
Birkely		Frederiksværk		
Grønnessegaard				Manor house.
Knud Rasmussen House		Hundested		
Villa Vendle		Ved Gærdet 1, 3220 Tisvildeleje		Country house built in 1912 to designs by Bent Helweg-Møller.

=== Helsingør Municipality ===
Name	Image	Location	Coordinates	Description
Buxtehude House				
Dalsborg		Rørtangsvej		House designed by Louis Hygom.
Danstruplund				Former country house.
Gurrehus		Gurrevej		Former country house.
Havreholm Slot		Havreholm		
Kronborg		Helsingør		
Marienlyst		Helsingør		
Ørsholt				
Valdemarslund		Gurre		

=== Hillerød Municipality ===
Name	Image	Location	Coordinates	Description
Batzke's House				House built in 1731 to designs by Johan Cornelius Krieger.
Carlsberg				House from the 1750s.
Favrholm				Former farmhouse from 1806.
Frederiksborg Castle		Hillerød		
Lowzon House				
Slotsforvalterens Hus				
Petersborg		Petersborgvej 13, 3400 Hillerød	Country house from 1804 built for Søren Kierkegaard's father Michael Pedersen Kierkegaard.	
Sandviggård			Former country house of Ulrich Kaas and other notable owners.	
Strødam				Former country house built for C. F. Tietgen.
Stud Master's House				House built in 1731 to designs by Johan Cornelius Krieger.

=== Køge Municipality ===
Name	Image	Location	Coordinates	Description	Ref
Gammel Køgegård					

== See also ==
- List of historic houses on Funen
- List of historic houses on Lolland
