= Grønningen, Copenhagen =

Street in Copenhagen, Denmark

Coordinates: 55.6894°N 12.5906°E

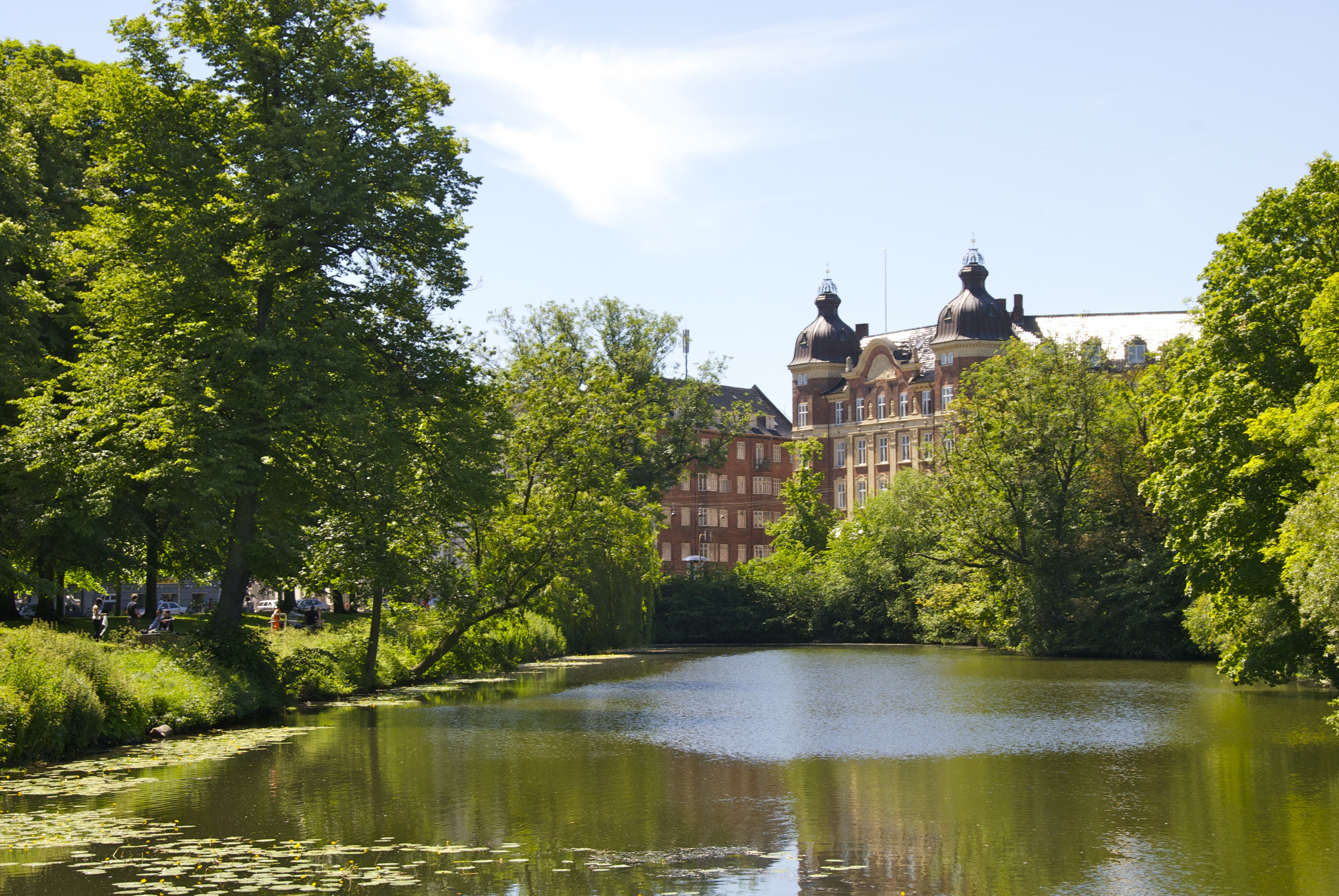
The corner of Grønningen and Esplanaden viewed from Kastellet

Grønningen is a street in central Copenhagen, Denmark, connecting Bredgade and the intersecting street Esplanaden to Oslo Plads in front of Østerport Station along the southwestern margin of the fortification Kastellet. It lends its name to the artists' cooperative Grønningen which was originally based in the street.

== History ==
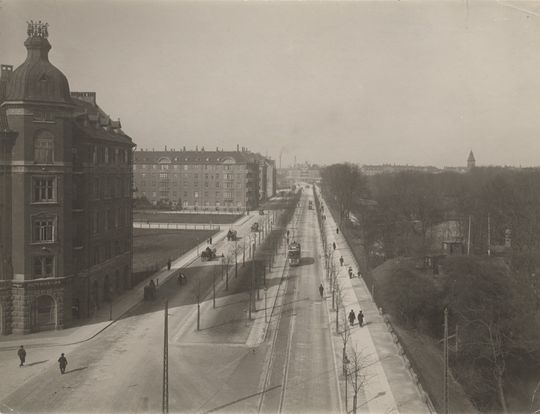
The street seen from a building on the corner of Bredgade in c. 1910

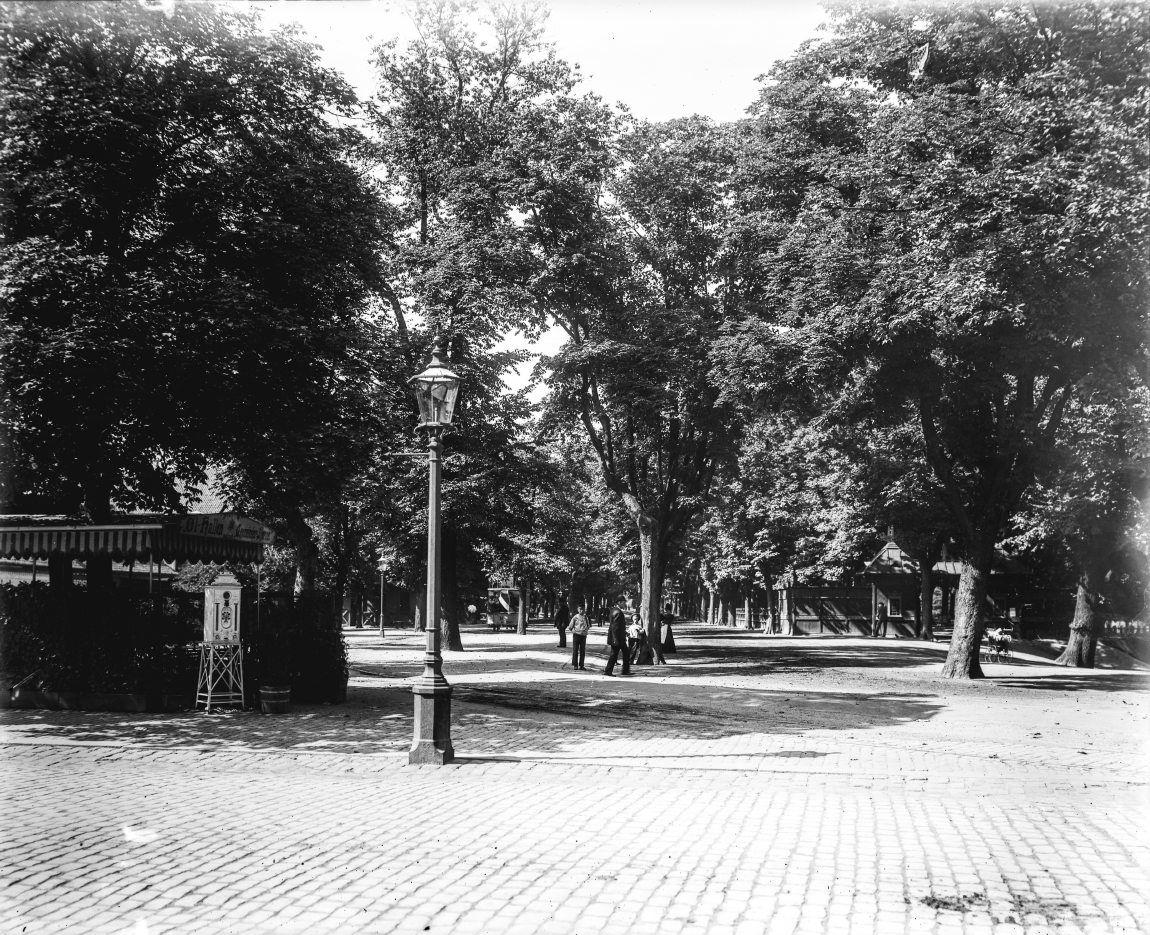
Grønningen photographed by Frederik Riise

The triangular area between Esplanaden, Store Kongensgade (Nyboder) and Kastellet was from 1782 home to a ropewalk. It was later converted into a Guard Hussars barracks. At the turn of the 20th century, it was decided to demolish the outdated installation to make way for high-end apartment buildings. A competition was held and a plan for redevelopment of the area was adopted by the city on 29 June 1903. Demolition of the barracks buildings began on 1 November 1905 and the area was sold to private investors shortly thereafter. A broad boulevard inspired by those of Haussmann in Paris replaced the outer moat of Kastellet and the smaller streets in the area were all named after localities associated with the island of Bornholm. The plan required all apartments facing Grønningen to have between six and 12 rooms while the rest of the apartments should have at least five rooms.

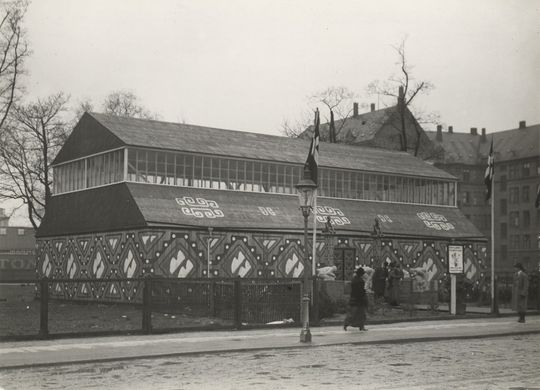
The "Indian Cottage" exhibition building

Construction began at the southern end of the street in 1905 and afterwards the buildings closest to Østerport Station followed. After that, sale of the expensive lots came to a standstill due to a surplus of apartments in the city at that time. In 1908, Copenhagen had a population of 400,000 and 10,000 vacant apartments.

A group of artists who had broken with Den Frie Udstilling received permission to erect an intermistic pavilion in one of the empty lots and took the name Grønningen after the street. The architect Carl Petersen designed the building which became colloquially known as "The Indian Cottage" (Danish: Indianerhytten) due to its eclectic style. It was pulled down after a few years and the artists had to find new premises elsewhere when interest in developing the lots resumed.

== Architecture ==
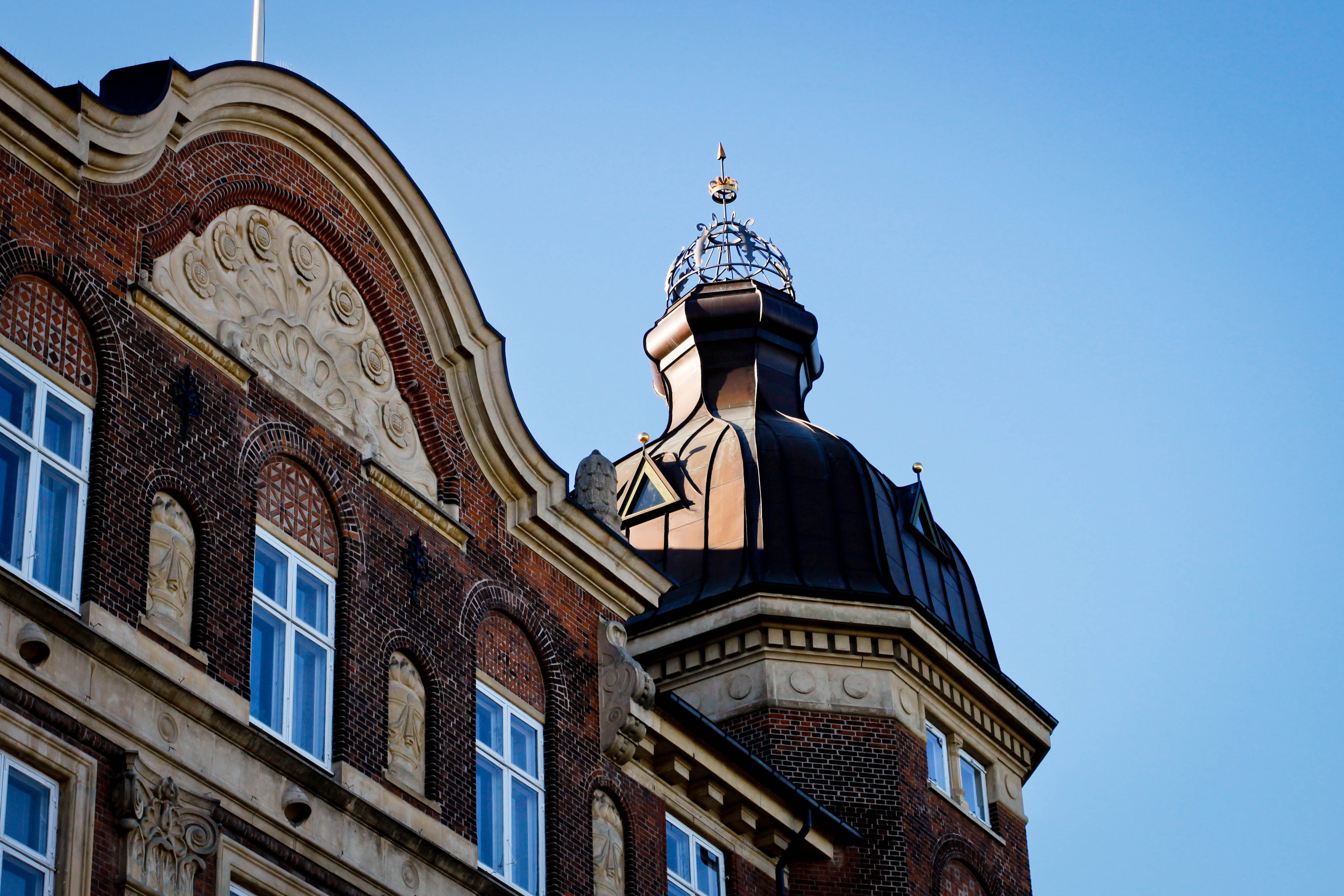
1 Grønningen

The stately apartment building on the corner of Grønningen and Esplanaden (Grønningen 1) was completed in 1906 to designs by Henning Hansen. It has two small towers flanking the main entrance. The building was expanded northwards by the same architect in 1933 (Grønningen 3a-b).

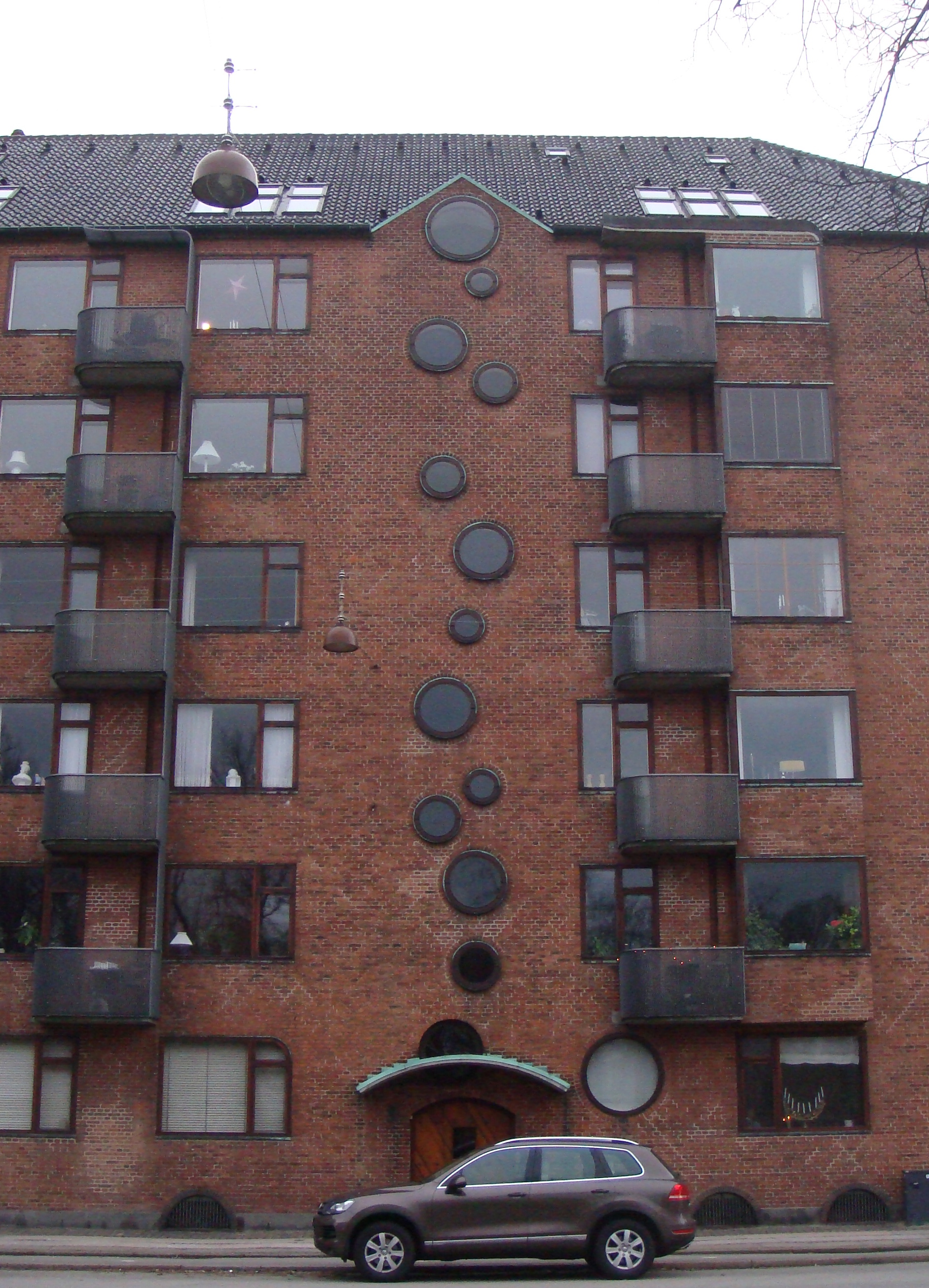
The Champagne House

The building at the other end of the street (Grønningen 21–25) is the former headquarters of Nordisk Livsforsikring Selskab (English: Nordic Life Inssurance Company). It was built in 1910 by Axel Preisler and was renovated in 2006. It now serves as head office for M. Goldschmidt Holding. The large neighbouring property at No. 17-19 is the former headquarters of Nordisk Livsforsikrings-Aktieselskab af 1897 and was built from 1913–1914 to designs by Vilhelm Fischer (completed by N.P.P. Gundstrup). The IT consultancy Netcompany is now based at No. 17.

The Hagemann Mansion (No. 11) was built by Carl Brummer in 1918 for the financier Paul Hagemanns. It now serves as Finland's embassy.

Built in 1935–36 to designs by Ib Lunding, the apartment building at N.. 7-9 is in spite of its robust Functionalist style known as the Champaign House due to its irregularly placed windows of the staircase. It was heritage listed in 1997.

== Sculptures ==
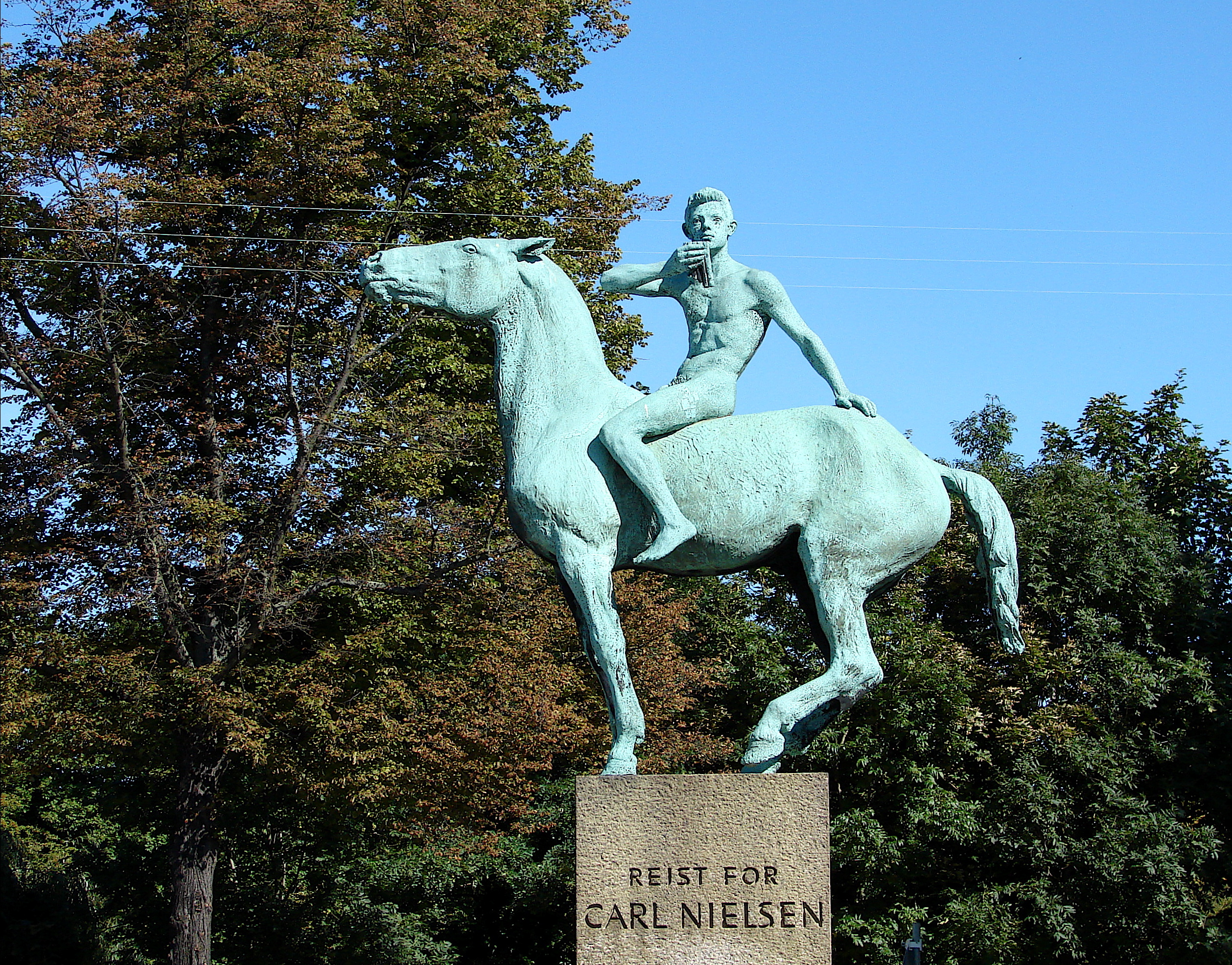
The Carl Nielsen memorial

At 25 Grønningen stands Anne Marie Carl-Nielsen's Pegasus statue which commemorates her husband, the composer Carl Nielsen.

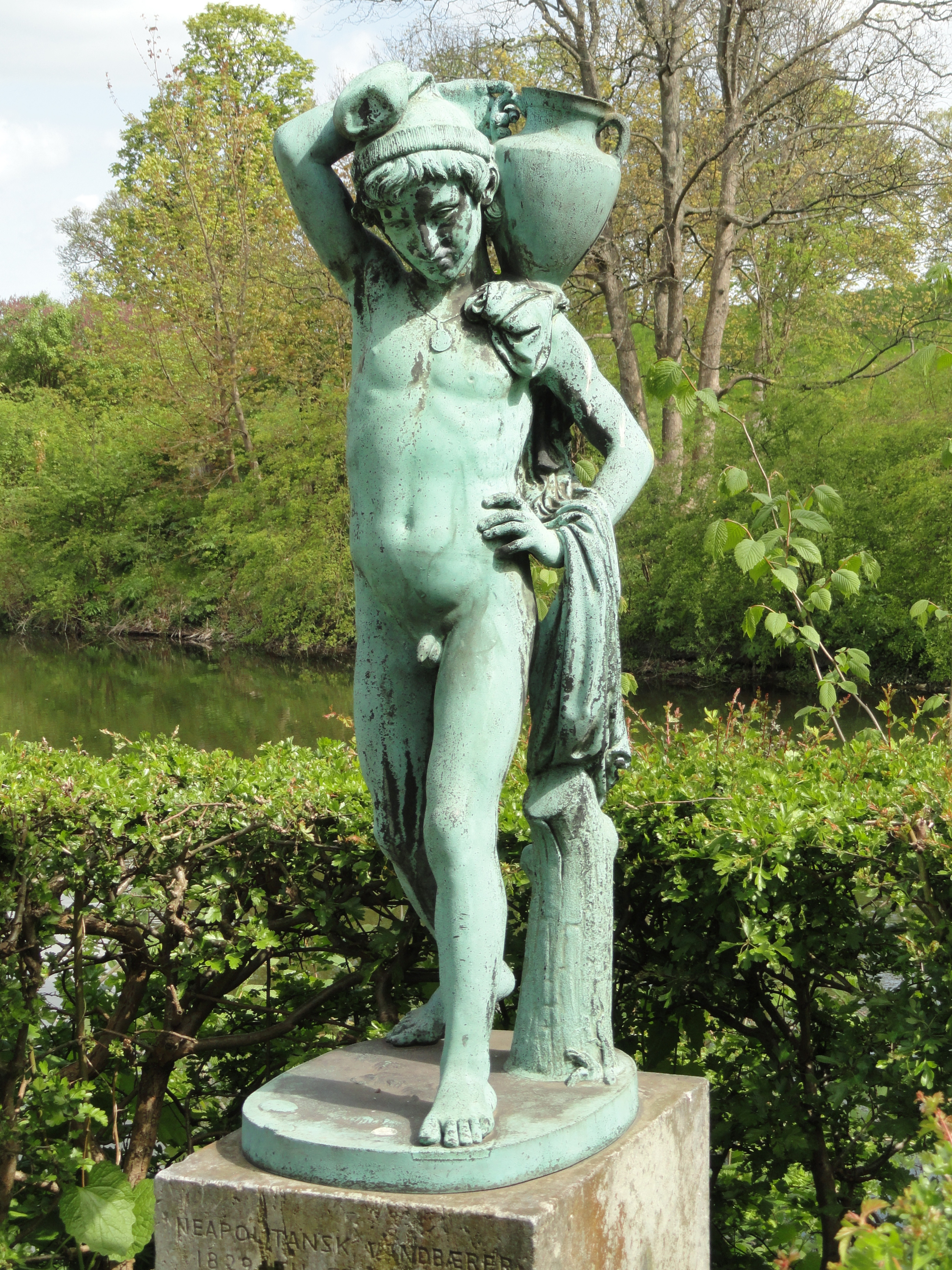
Neapolitan Fisher Boy with Pitcher

The grassy area on the east side of the street features a bronze copy of Theobald Stein's Neapolitan Fisher Boy with Pitcher from 1901. It was a donation from Carl Jacobsen's Albertina Foundation.

A small triangular greenspace sponsored by M. Goldschmidt Holding was created in front of the company's head office on the corner of Grønningen and Store Kongensgade. It includes a bronze statue of the titan Atlas which was originally commissioned by Carl Jacobsen from the sculptor Nicolai Schmidt in 1899. It has previously decorated the roof of Carlsberg's building in Copenhagen Freeport and later the Central Machine Building in the Carlsberg neighbourhood. The sculpture is used in M. Goldschmidt's logo.
