= Store Kongensgade =

Street in Copenhagen, Denmark

Coordinates: 55.6852°N 12.5885°E

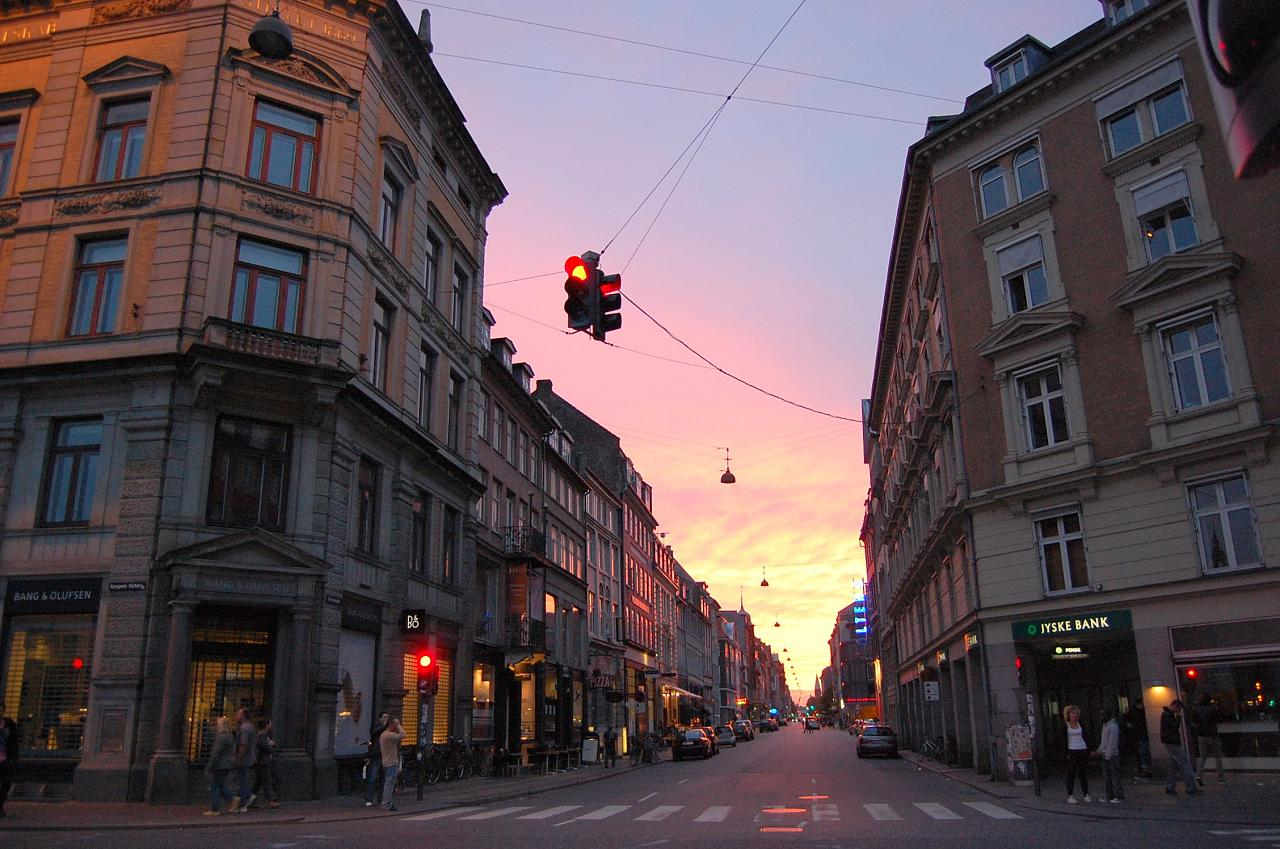
Store Kongensgade seen from Kongens Nytorv

Store Kongensgade (Danish pronunciation: [ˈstoːɐ ˈkʰʌŋn̩sˌkɛːðə]; lit. 'Great King's Street') is the longest street in central Copenhagen, Denmark. It extends northeast from Kongens Nytorv to Esplanaden, running parallel to Bredgade, where it breaks left, continuing northwest to Grønningen.

Store Kongensgade is part of the Ring 2 thoroughfare. Traffic is one-way, moving from Østerport station to Kongens Nytorv, while traffic moving in the opposite direction goes by Bredgade which is also one-way.

== History ==
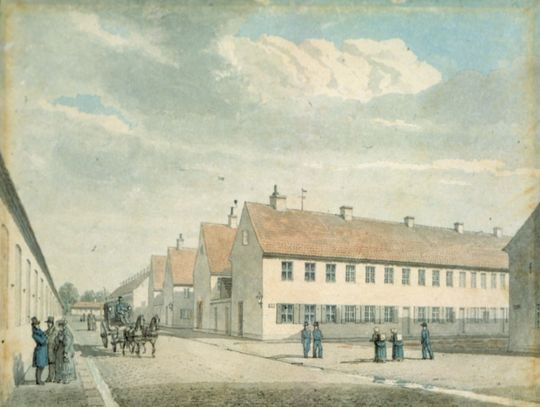
Store Kongensgade in 1849, painting by Heinrich Gustav Ferdinand Holm

Store Kongensgade was established in 1663 in the area known as New Copenhagen., a large expansion of fortified Copenhagen which had recently been created by giving the city's East Rampart a new course. The street connected the King's New Square, Kongens Nytorv, to Frederikshavn Fortress (now Kastellet), which had just been expanded. The name of the street was originally Ny(e) Kongensgade (literally: "New King's Street") since the city already had a Kongensgade on Christianshavn where present day Wildersgade north and south of Torvegade was known as Store and Lille Kongensgade respectively. The two streets received their current names in 1859.

The Guard Hussars' barracks was in the 19th century located at the northern end of the street, next to Kastellet. The facility was demolished in about 1900 and the site was built over in connection with the establishment of Grønningen. The masterplan for the area was adopted on 29 June 1903. The smaller streets in the area have names associated with the island of Bornholm.

== Notable buildings and residents ==
Bernhard Hertz Sølvvarefabrik (No. 23) is a former silver factory created by the goldsmith Bernhard Hertz in 1782.

The Danneskiold-Laurvig Mansion at No. 58, from about 1745, is attributed to the German court architect Johann Adam Soherr. Mecanicus Kretz' House (No. 67A-V) is a listed complex dating from the 1830s. The De Coninck House (No. 72) was built for Frédéric de Coninck, probably to design by the French architect Joseph-Jacques Ramée.

The building at No. 86-88 was built to an opulent, Historicist design by Ferdinand Meldahl in connection with the rebuilding of the Marble Church. The intention was to build an identical building on the opposite corner but Carl Frederik Tietgen who sponsored the rebuilding of the church never managed to acquire the site. The building was for more than a hundred years left as an empty site and became Colloquially known as "Tietgen's Annoyance" ("Tietgens Ærgrelse"). In 2006, Realdania charged Tony Fretton with the task of designing a modern building which fitted into the historic environment. The building was completed in 2010.

Christians Plejehus (No. 108) is a former hospital and workhouse built to design by Carl Pflueg in 1765 to 1769.

The street has a colourful mixture of facades representing different periods and architectural styles. The last section of the street, north of Esplanaden, passes the Nyboder terraces.

== Public art and memorials ==
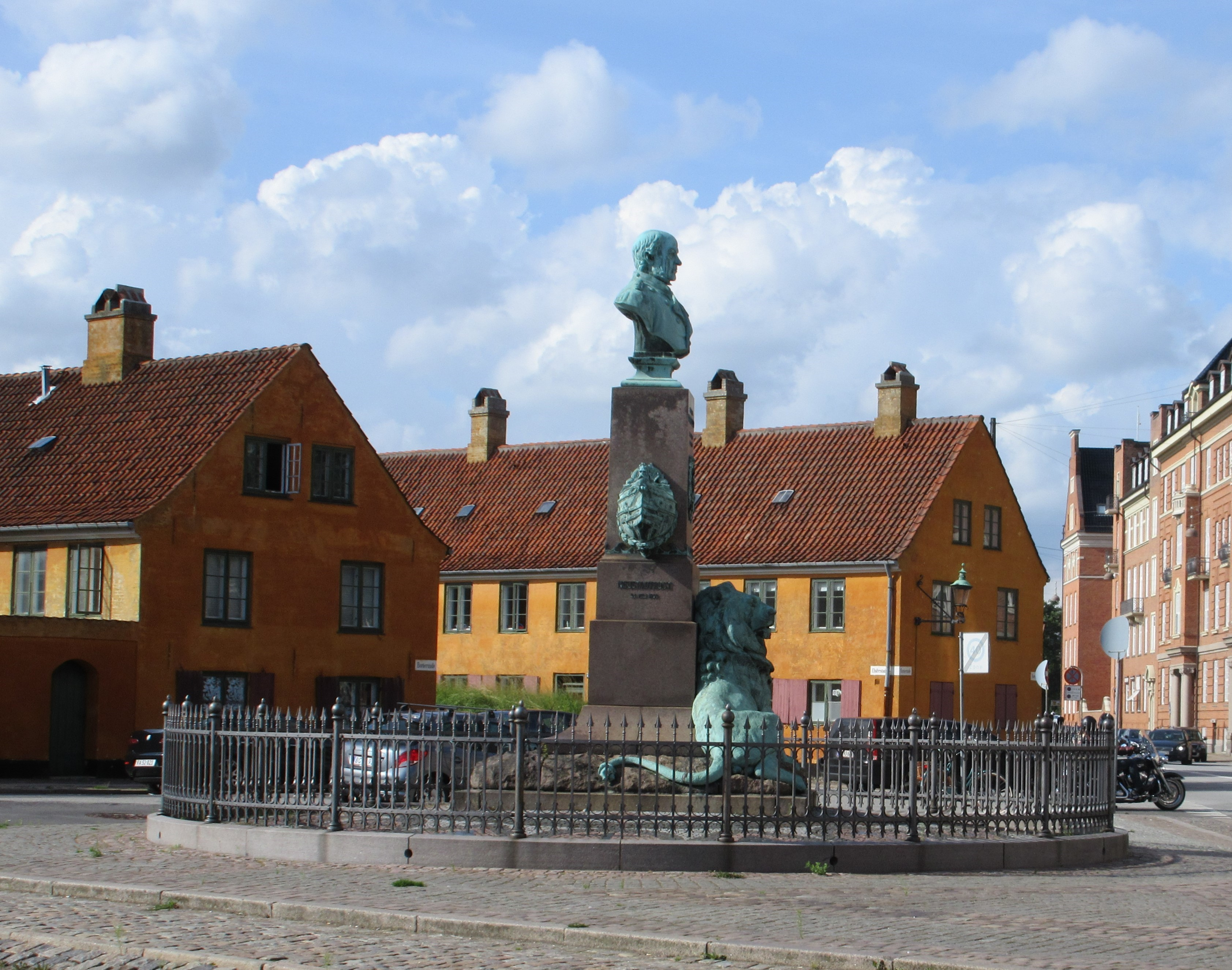
The Edouard Suenson Memorial

At Store Kongensgade, in front of Nyboder, there is a memorial to Vice Admiral Edouard Suenson who commanded the Danish ships in the Battle of Heligoland 9 May 1864. The monument was designed by Theobald Stein and inaugurated on 9 May 1889. It consists of a bust of Suenson mounted on a high plinth decorated with a laurel wreath and prows. On its front side, it has the inscription: "VICE-ADMIRAL/EDOUARD SUENSON/Vorn 13 APRIL 1805/DIED 16 MAY 1887 The foot of the plinth is guarded by bronze lions which hold a coat of arms with the inscription "HELGOLAND/9 MAY/1864".

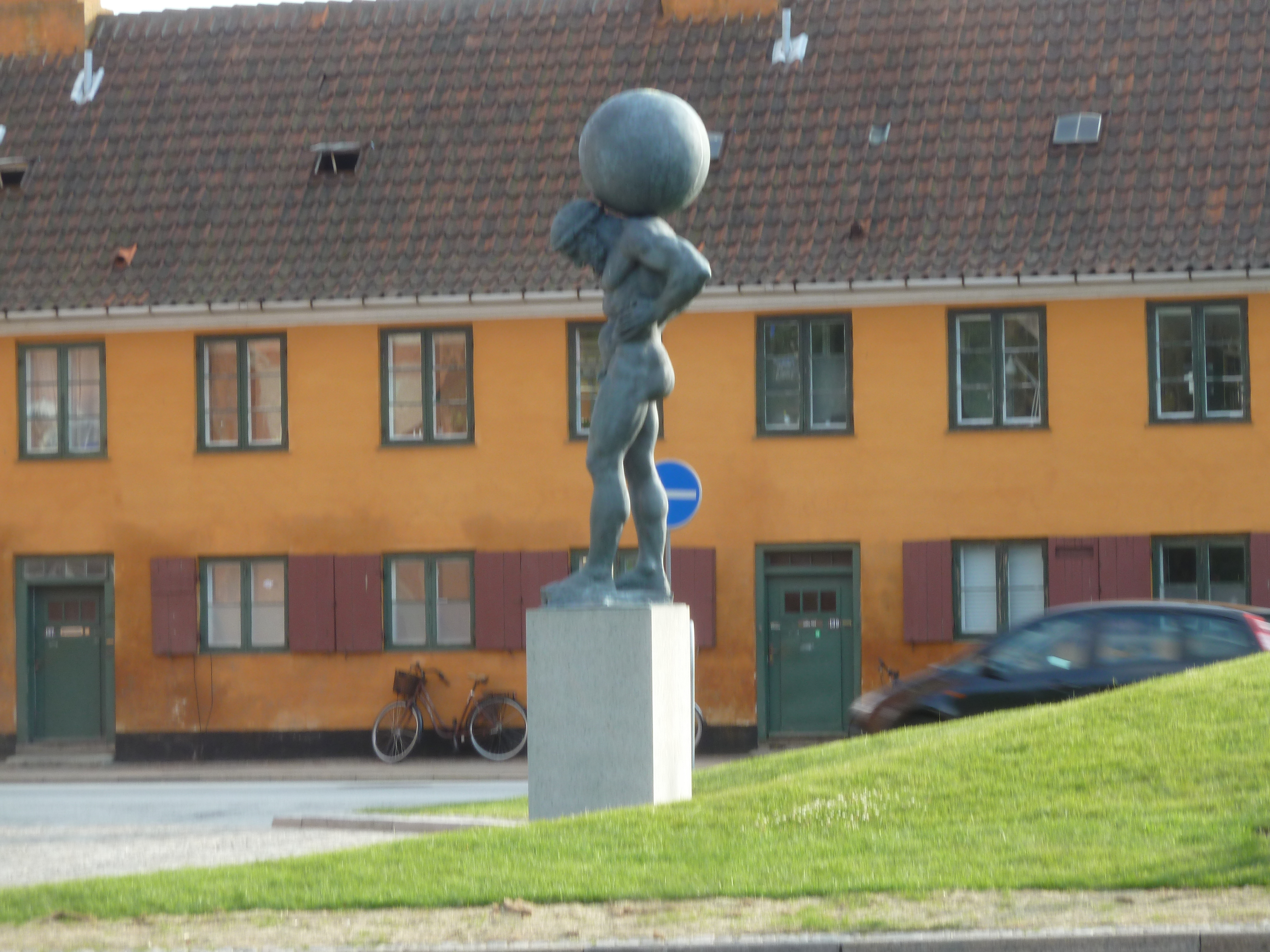
The Atlas statue

At the pointed corner of Store Kongensgade and Grønningen, looking north, stands Anne Marie Carl-Nielsen's Pegasus statue which commemorates her husband, the composer Carl Nielsen.

A small triangular greenspace sponsored by M. Goldschmidt Holding was created in front of the company's head office on the corner of Grønningen and Store Kongensgade. It includes a bronze statue of the titan Atlas which was originally commissioned by Carl Jacobsen from the sculptor Nicolai Schmidt in 1899. It has previously decorated the roof of Carlsberg's building in Copenhagen Freeport and later the Central Machine Building in the Carlsberg neighbourhood. The sculpture is used in M. Goldschmidt's logo.

== Cultural references ==
Store Kongensgade is used as a location in the 1977 Olsen-banden film The Olsen Gang Outta Sight.

== Image gallery ==
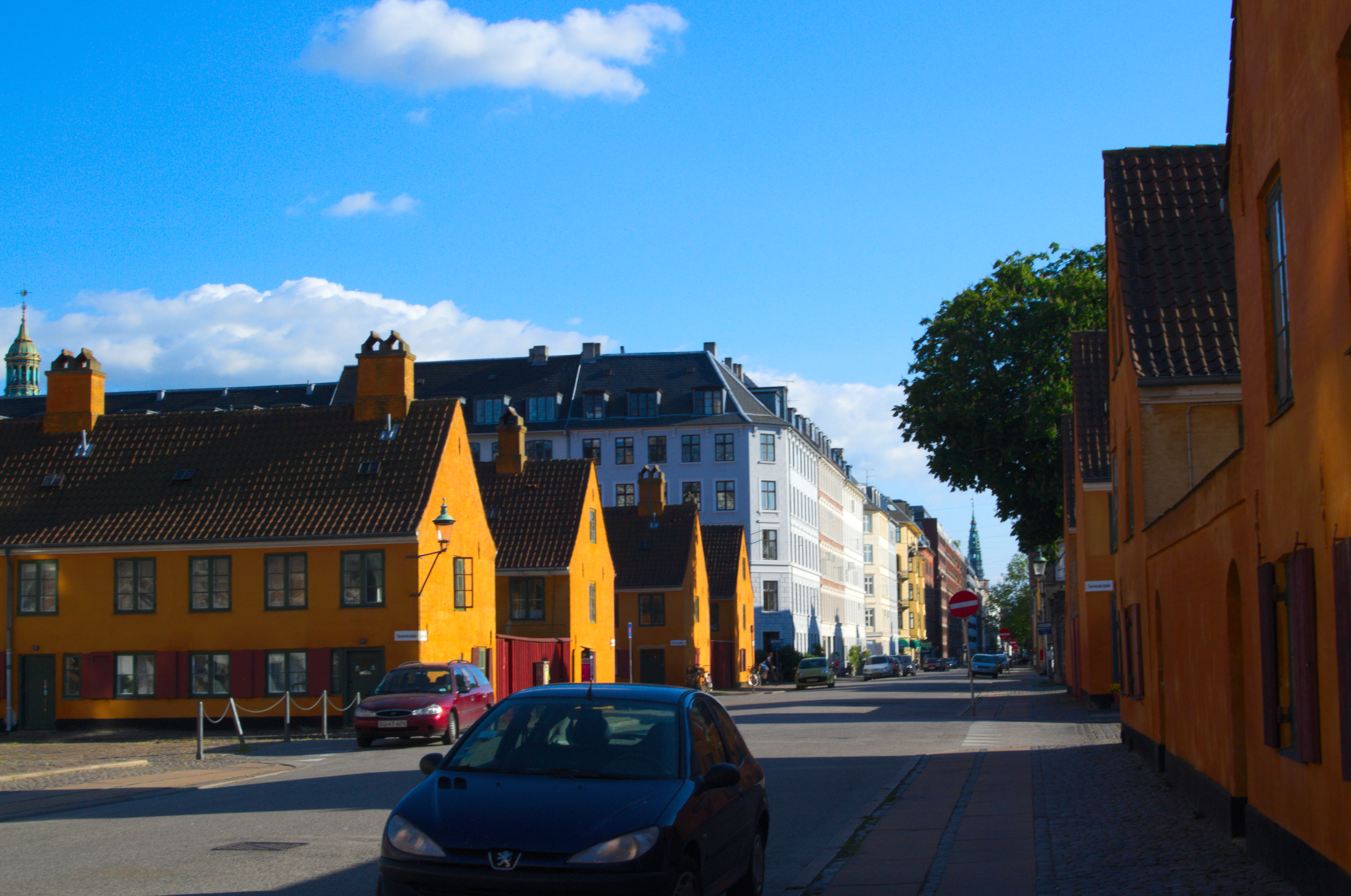
Nyboder terraces

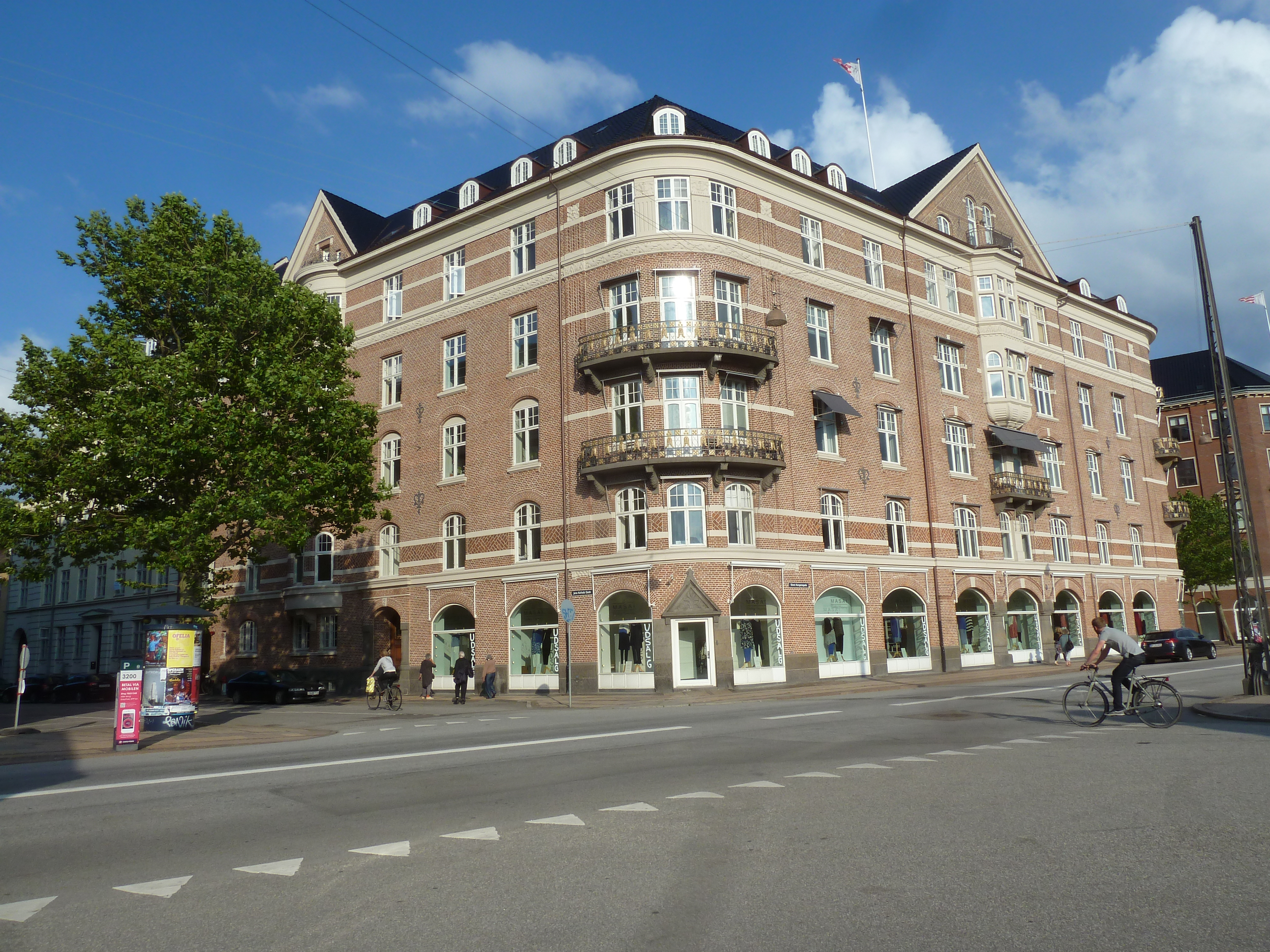
No. 122, opposite Nyboder (1906)

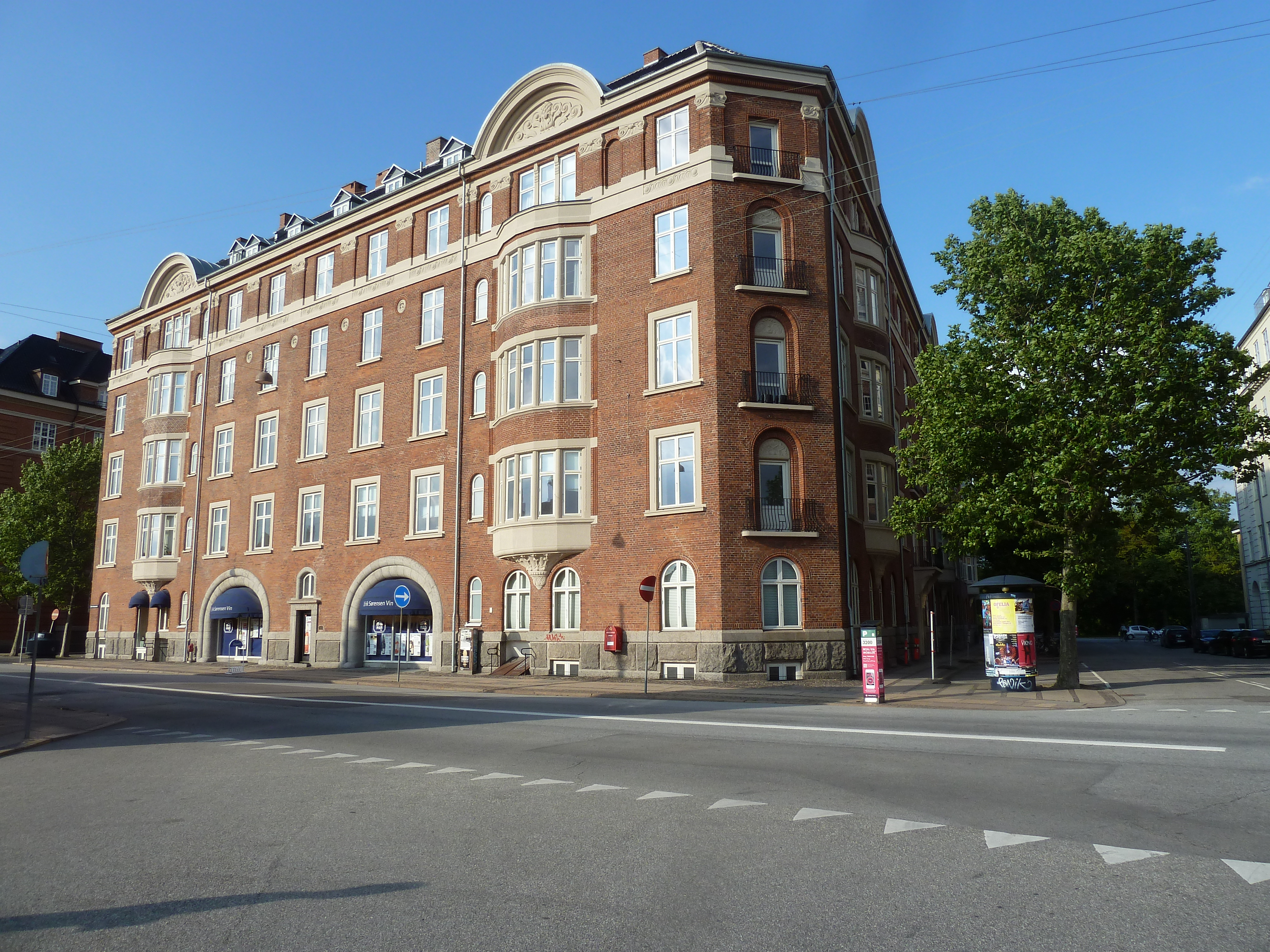
No. 124, opposite Nyboder (1908)
