= Smidstrupøre =

Building in Rudersdal Municipality, Denmark

Smidstrypøre
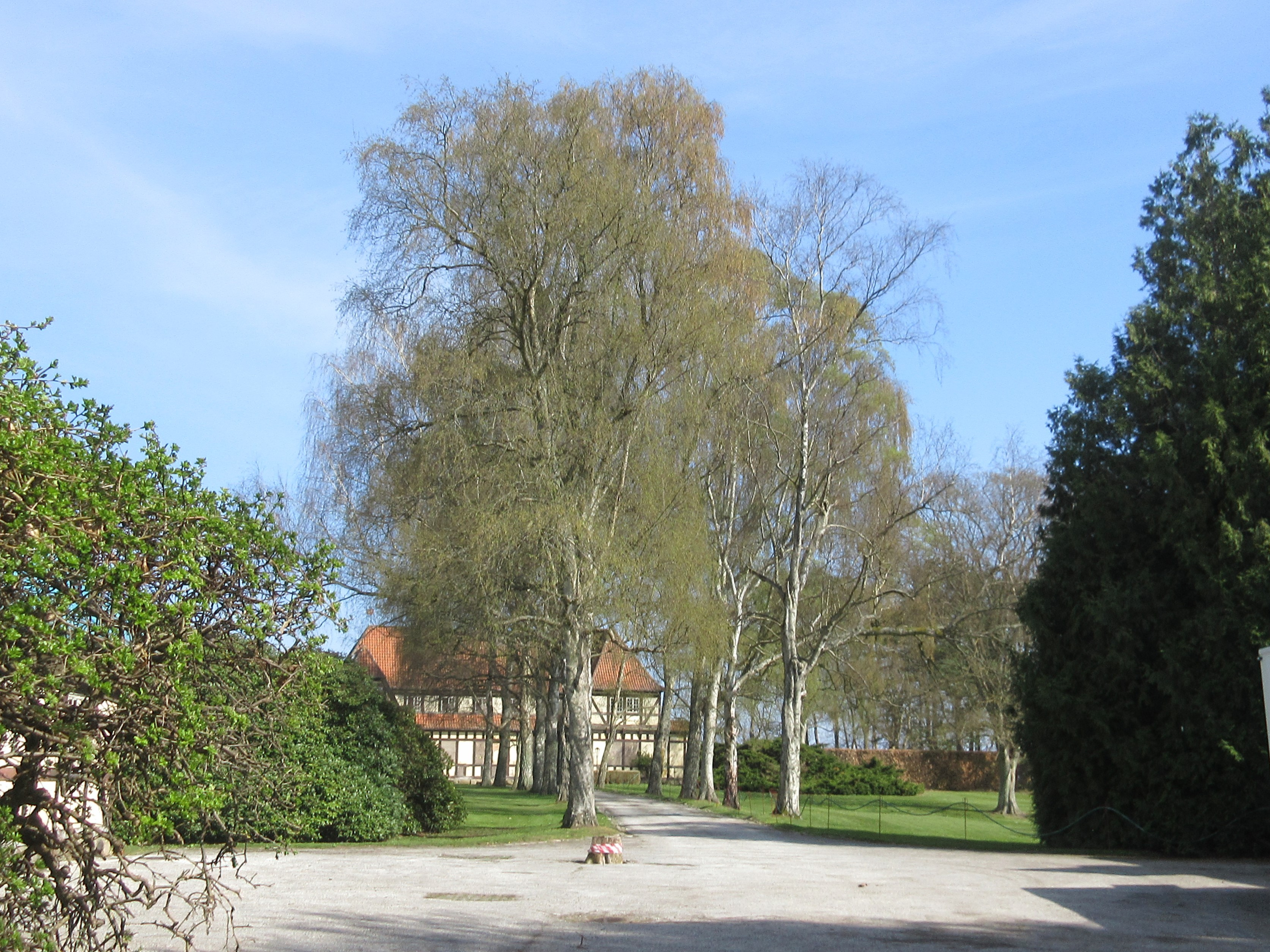
- Smidstrupøre just visible through the trees in April 2025.

General information
- Location: Vedbæk, Rudersdal Municipality, Smidstrupørevej 8, 2960 Rungsted Kyst, Denmark
- Coordinates: 55°52′12.65″N 12°33′17.53″E
- Construction started: 1917

Design and construction
- Architect: Carl Brummer

Smidstrupøre is a former country house in Rungsted on the coast north of Copenhagen, Denmark. The half-timbered structure was completed in 1917 for businessman and art collector Valerius Ragoczy to a National Romantic design by the architect Carl Brummer. The property is now owned by baron Johan Wedell-Wedellsborg. A plan for restoring the building was revealed in 2025.

== History ==
=== Valerius and Laura Ragoczy ===
Smidstrupøre was built for the businessman Valerius Ragoczy, an immigrant of Hungarian descent who had made a fortune in the leather industry. He was born in Sagar in present-day Germany but had moved to Copenhagen in 1898. Together with Louis H. Poulsen, he had subsequently established a successful business as a leather goods wholesaler. Through the acquisition of a number of smaller leather goods companies and other investments, Poulsen & Ragoczy became one of the leading leather goods companies in the Nordic countries. Ragoczy's wife Laura (née Kandeldorff) was a sculptor.

The architect Carl Brummer was charged with designing Laura and Valerius Ragoczy's new summer residence.

Valerius Ragoczy was a passionate collector of antiques, books and coins. Their guests included Karen Blixen from nearby Rungstedlund as well as sculptor Axel Poulsen and painter/writer Elisabeth Bergstrand Poulsen, painter Carl Frydensberg, concert singer Nora Elé, sculptors Siegfried and Olga Wagner, painter Svend Hammershøi, painter Ludvig Find, painter Bertha Dorph, actor Arne Weel, painter Jørgen Aabye and painter Johannes Glob. Ragoczy owned a Humber Super Snipe 1939 cabriolet. It was used for driving Montgomery, Churchill and Kurt Carlsen through Copenhagen.

Valerius and Laura Ragoczy died in 1958 and 1964. They are buried at Hørsholm Cemetery. The sculpture on their grave was created by Axel Poulsen.

Smidstruoøre was later the home of Leo Pharma CEC Knud Abildgaard Elling. The property was later acquired by Codan Medical-founder Stig Husted-Andersens. He was known for his vast portfolio of historic properties. He died as Denmark's third-largest landowner in 2008. In December 2022, it was announced that Johan Wedell-Wedellsborg had acquired the property.

== Architecture ==
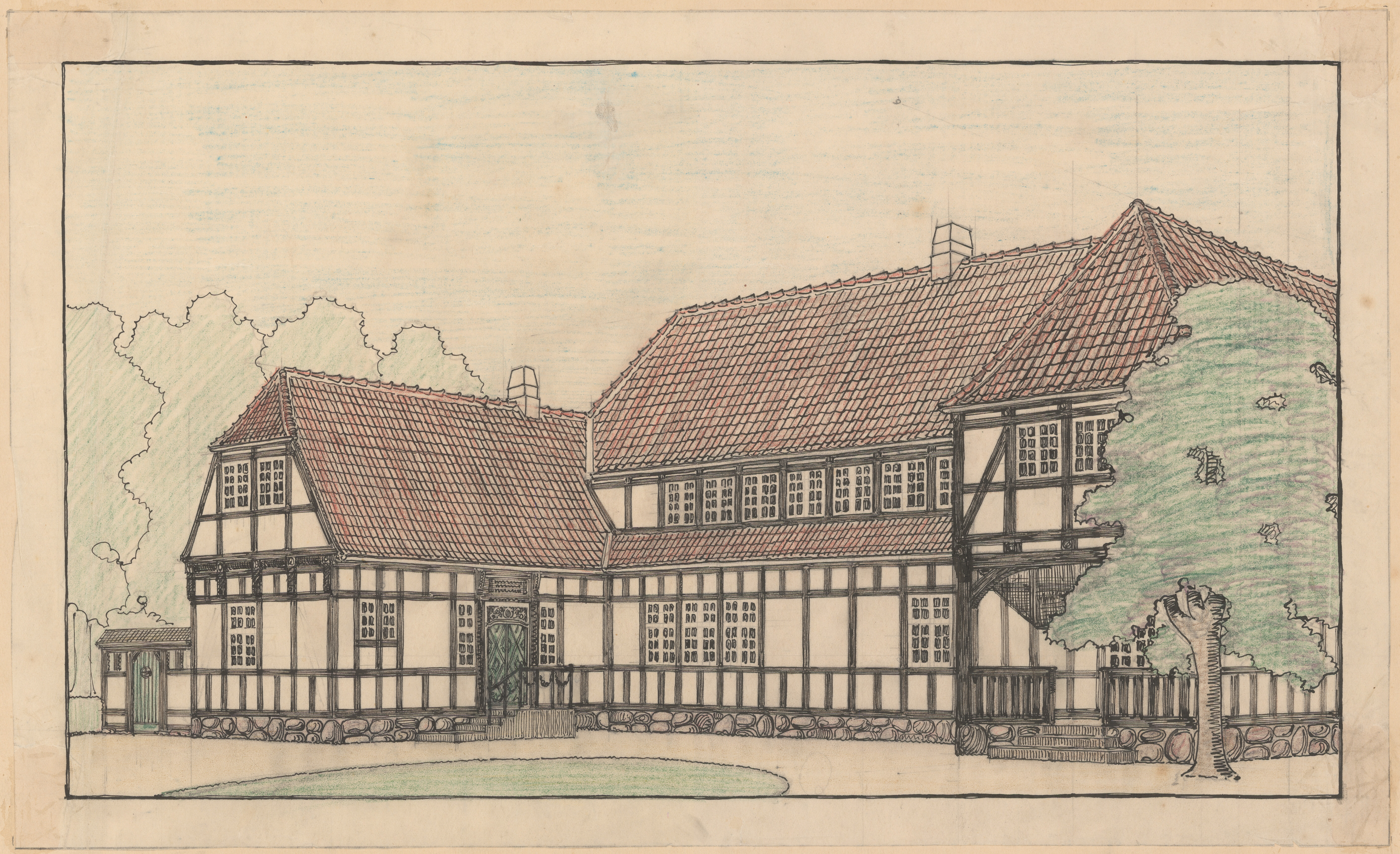
