= Spurveskjul =

Building in Lyngby-Taarbæk Municipality, Denmark

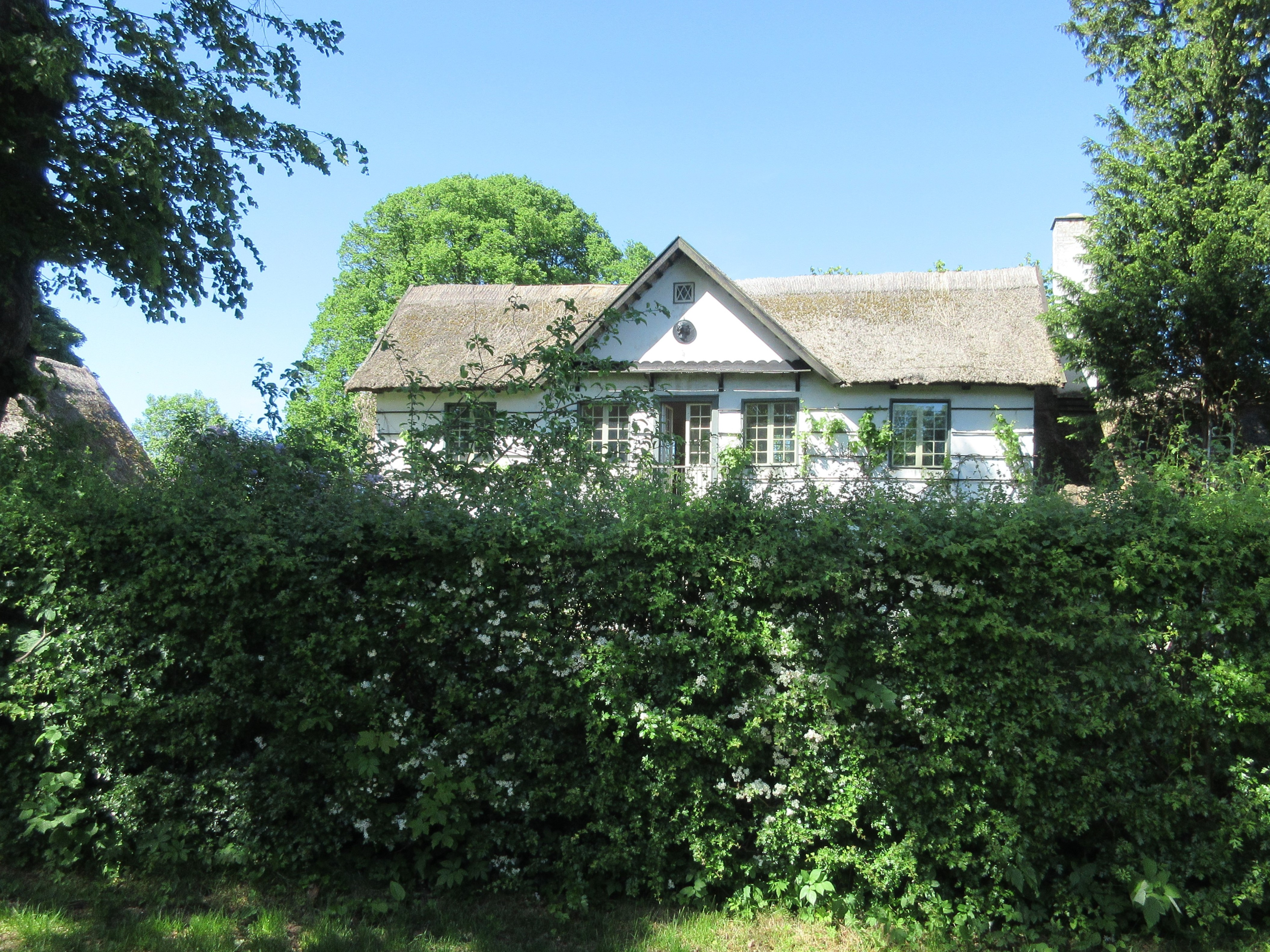
- The house seen from the south
- Interactive map of the Spurveskjul area

General information
- Architectural style: Neoclassical
- Location: Copenhagen, Denmark
- Coordinates: 55°46′59.48″N 12°27′28.73″E
- Construction started: 1804
- Completed: 1805

Design and construction
- Architect: Nicolai Abildgaard

Spurveskjul is Nicolai Abildgaard's former country house in Virum north of Copenhagen, Denmark.

== History ==
Nicolai Abildgaard bought a property in Virum and in 1804-05 constructed a new two-storey country house for his own use. He gave it the name Spurveskjul (Sparrow's Hideaway) after the adjacent forest. The house was surrounded by an extensive garden. Abildgaard wrote many of his friends in Italy and France, asking them to bring plants and seeds for his garden back to Denmark. He was one of the first to grow broccoli in Denmark. Abildgaard died at Spurveskjul on 4 June 1809.

== Architecture ==
The two-storey main building from 1805 stands on an older foundation. It is a narrow, rectangular building constructed with timber framing and white finishing. The thatched roof features a wall dormer on both sides. The triangular gable of the south-facing dormer features a portrait relief of Nicolai Abildgaard. The main entrance is located in the western gable.

A one-storey side wing extends from the east gable of the two-storey main wing. It was originally a free-standing building from the 1730s but connected to the main wing in 1846. It now contains a kitchen, bathroom and a room with an open fireplace.

== Today ==
The architect Jørgen Rasmussen bought the house for DKK 2.2 mio. in 1992.
