= Buresø =

Lake in Denmark

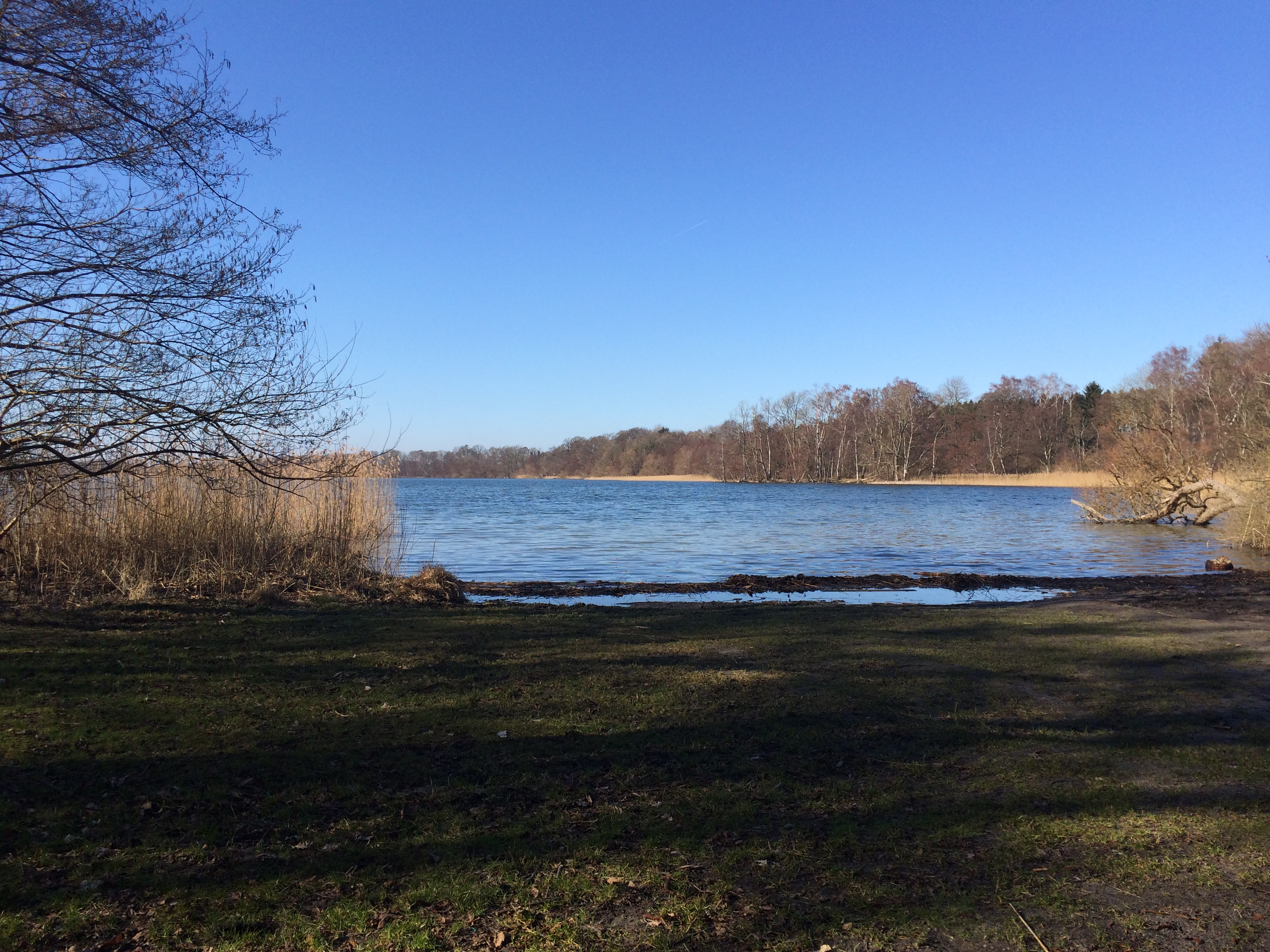
- Buresø in 2017

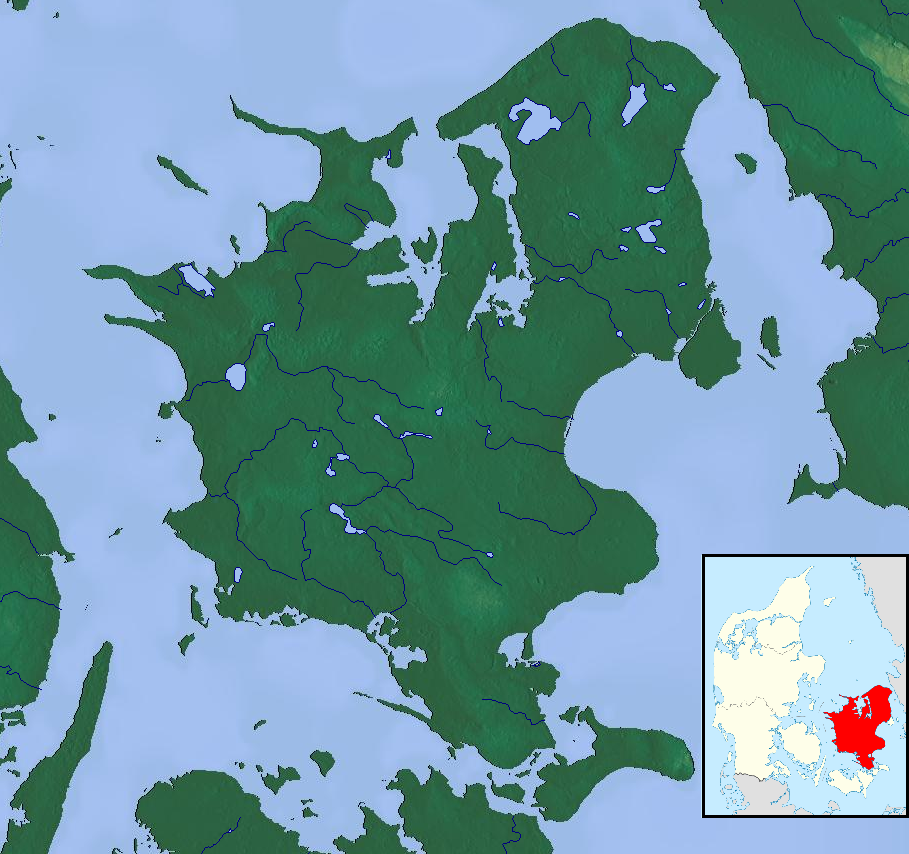
- Location within Zealand
- Location: Zealand
- Coordinates: 55°49′30″N 12°13′04″E
- Primary outflows: Græse Å
- Surface area: 76 ha (190 acres)
- Average depth: 6.7 km (4.2 mi)
- Max. depth: 10.8 km (6.7 mi)
- Settlements: Slangerup

Buresø is a lake located in a tunnel valley, immediately southeast of Slangerup, where Allerød, Frederikssund and Egedal municipalities meet. The tunnel valley, which was formed during the last ice age, runs in an east-west direction and can be followed along Mølleåen all the way to the Øresund coast. Between Buresø and the nearby Bastrup Sø there is a watershed. Buresø drains via Græse Å to the west to Roskilde Fjord, Bastrup Sø drains to the east to Mølleåen. Buresø and surroundings is part of Naturpark Mølleåen.

== Nature protection area ==
Parts of Buresø are located in the Mølleåen Nature Reserve while the north side borders the conservation Kedelsø-Langsødalen Søen is part of Natura 2000 area no. 139 Øvre Mølleådal, Furesø and Frederiksdal Skov.
