= Hagemann Mansion =

Town mansion in Copenhagen, Denmark

Coordinates: 55°41′20″N 12°35′27″E

- Hagemanns Palæ
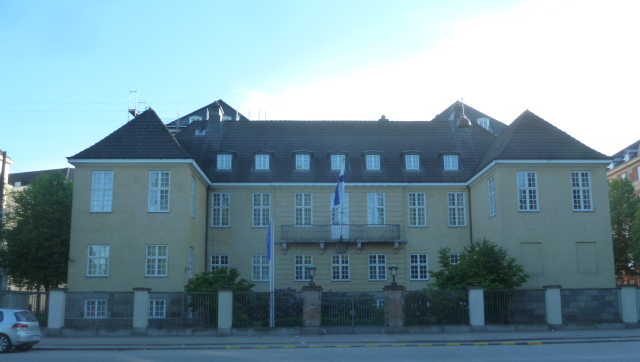
- Interactive map of the Hagemann Mansion area

General information
- Architectural style: Neo-Baroque
- Location: Copenhagen, Denmark
- Completed: 1918
- Client: Paul Hagemann
- Owner: State of Finland

Design and construction
- Architect: Carl Brummer

The Hagemann Mansion is a town mansion located at Grønningen 11 in Copenhagen, Denmark. It now serves as the Finnish embassy and the ambassodor's residence in Copenhagen.

== History ==
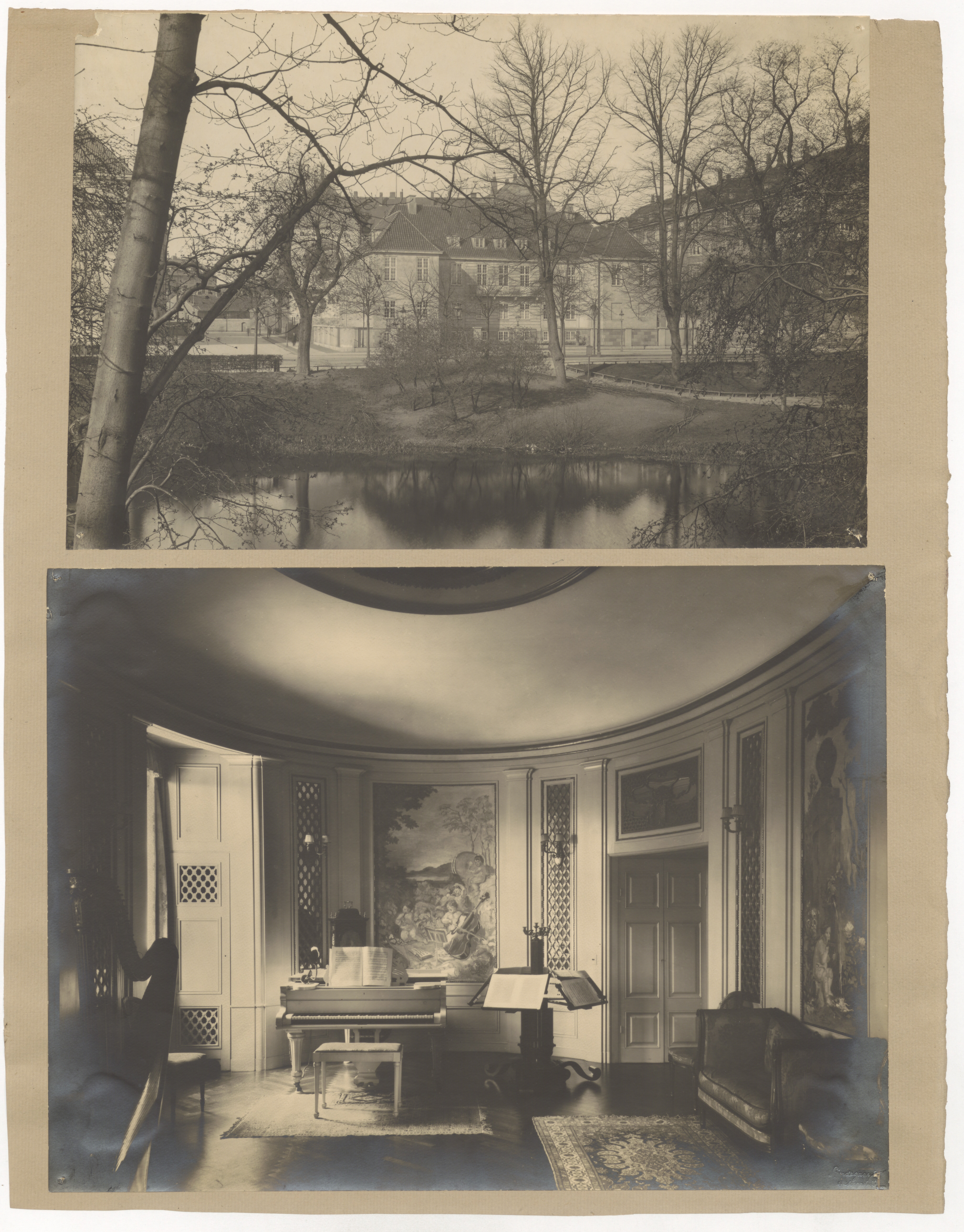
The Hagemann Mansion.

The mansion was built for the financier Paul Hagemann in 1918. The architect was Carl Brummer.

The Finnish state purchased the building from Hagemann in 1943. One of Hagemann's sons, Jørgen Hagemann, had been a military volunteer on the Finnish side in the Winter War against the Soviet Union and again in the Continuation War where he was killed in action at Hangö in the summer of 1941.

== Today ==
Hagemann Mansion

The building contains the official residence of the Finnish ambassador to Denmark and the embassy facilities, including the Finnish consulate in Denmark.
