= Birkeborg =

Former manor house in Skodsborg

Villa Birkeborg
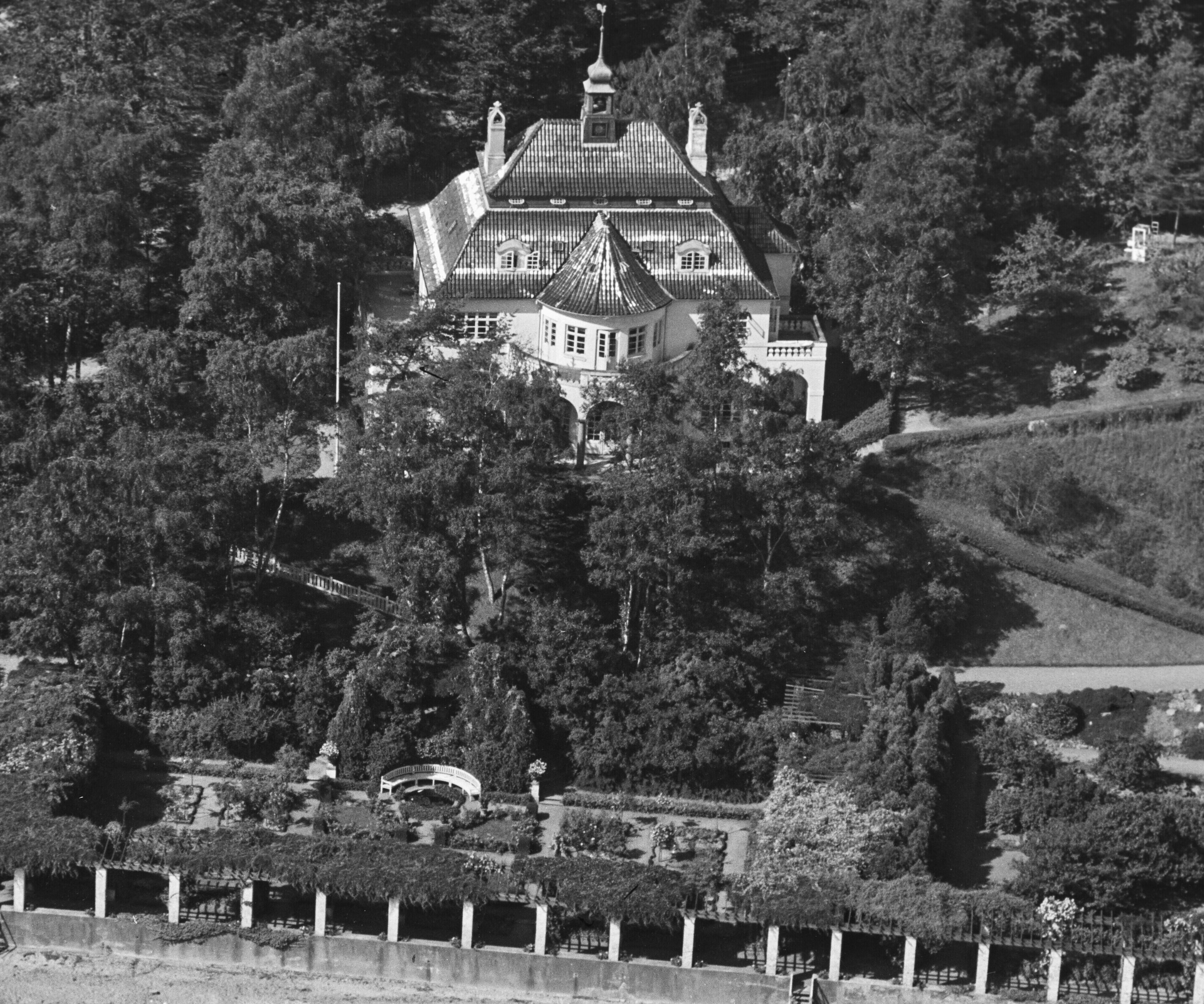
- Aerial photography of Birkeborg, as seen from Øresund in ca. 1936.
- Interactive map of the Villa Birkeborg area
- Alternative names: Villa Birkeborg

General information
- Architectural style: National Romantic style
- Location: Skodsborg Strandvej 240-246, Skodsborg, Denmark
- Coordinates: 55.833875°N 12.573507°E
- Year built: 1909-1910
- Demolished: 1966

Design and construction
- Architect: Carl Harald Brummer
- Awards and prizes: Eckersberg Medal (1911)

Birkeborg, also called Villa Birkeborg, is a former country house and mansion in Skodsborg, Rudersdal Municipality, situated on the Øresund coast north of Copenhagen, Denmark.

Designed by architect Carl Harald Brummer, the mansion was built between 1909 and 1910. Over the next 50 years, Birkeborg served as a country house and summer residence for several wealthy Copenhagen families until it was demolished in the 1960s. The property has since been converted into a recreational beach park, Birkeborg Park, renamed the Struckmann Park, in 1973.

== History ==
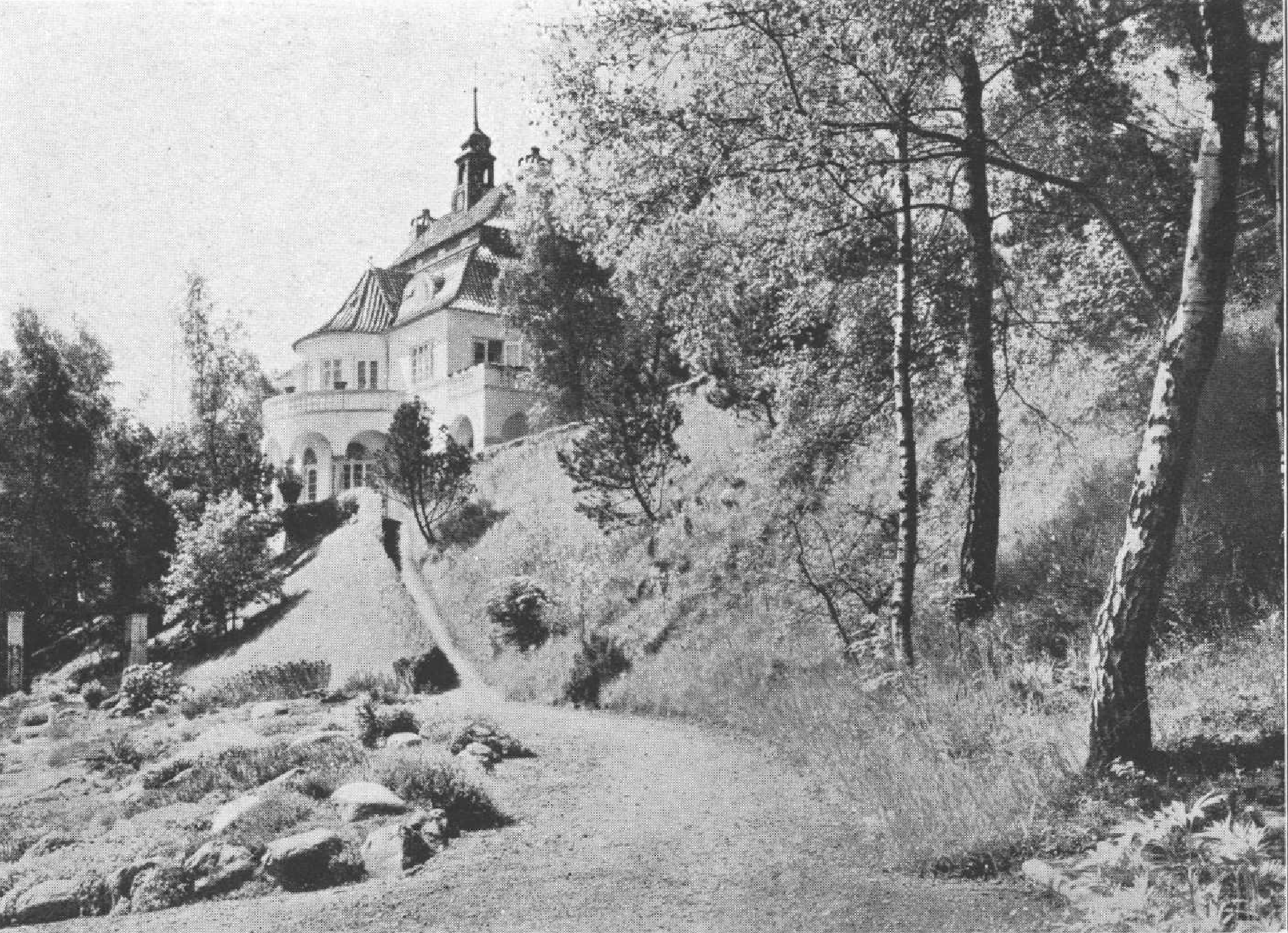
Birkeborg as seen from the beach garden.

The area on which Birkeborg was eventually constructed was originally parcelled out from the Aggershvile estate, and Birkeborg was built on the Aggershvile hill (Danish: Aggershvilebakken). The grounds of the Birkeborg estate totalled about 3 barrels of land (Danish: tønder), equal to over 16,000 square metres.

The mansion itself with adjoining pergola and pavilion was designed by architect Carl Brummer, for which he was awarded the Eckersberg Medal in 1911. In addition, an adjoining caretaker's residence was also constructed on the grounds. A grand and stately landscape garden was established on the property, designed and maintained by Danish garden architect, Erik Erstad-Jørgensen.

Birkeborg was built during World War I for a Swedish war profiteer (Danish: Gullaschbaron), Lorenz Beijers, and was a typical example of the prevailing Swedish-German architectural style, that influenced Swedish architecture after the marriage of Victoria of Baden and Gustaf V in 1881. The building featured four storeys, a roof superstructure with a tower clock and a columned colonnade facing the beach, dominating the more modest villas on Strandvejen.

In 1916, shipowner and merchant, Andreas Erlandsen (1877-1943) bought Birkeborg. He purchased a vast piece of land to the north to expand the garden, and used it as a summer residence until 1926, where the wealthy Artom Rand (1880-1956), director of Copenhagen Fruit Auctions acquired the mansion. Rand was married to Rigmor Rand (née Aller), the daughter of Danish publisher Carl Aller, and they lived at Birkeborg until Rand's death in 1956, whereafter Rigmor alone owned the property. Rigmor was also the co-owner of the grand manor house Sophienholm on the shore of Lake Bagsværd in Lyngby, from 1926 to 1963.

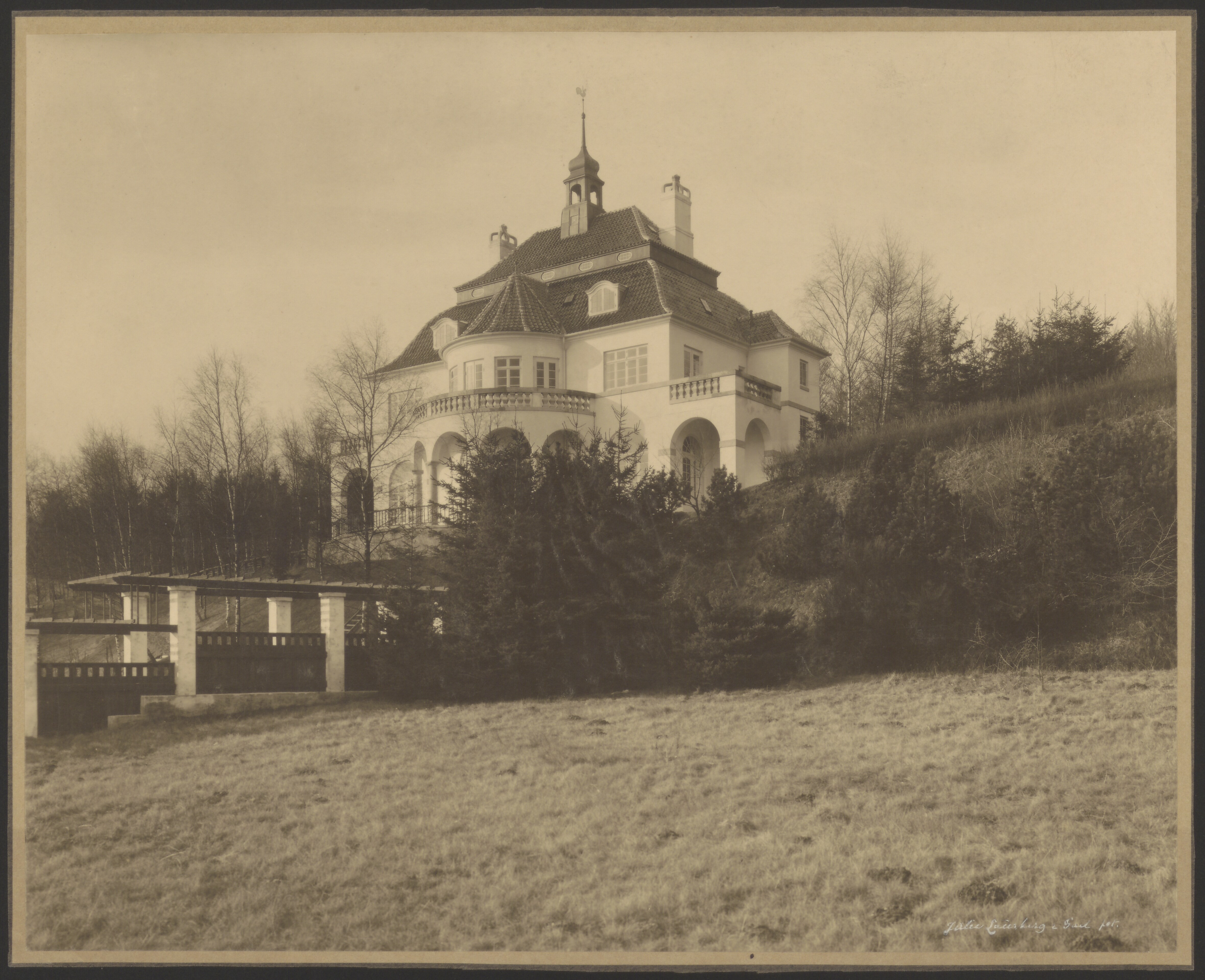
Villa Birkeborg in 1911.

In 1960, Rigmor Rand sold the property to a local master builder, Arp Hansen. Shortly afterwards, in 1961, the Danish Ministry of Culture acquired the Birkeborg property from Hansen, after which the demolition of the mansion began and was completed in 1966. In connection with the dismantling, a public recreational beach park was established on the vacated area, initially called the ‘Birkeborg Park’, however in 1973 it was renamed the Struckmann Park (Danish: Struckmannparken), named after the chairman of the Danish Society for Nature Conservation and one of the pioneers of Danish nature conservation, Erick Struckmann.

== Architectural features ==
The building was built on an Öland stone plinth, with plastered and slightly yellow-washed facades. The roof surfaces were covered with black glazed tiles and the vertical wall of the mansard roof was covered with copper.

The hall extended over two storeys and had access to the curved loggia from the living room; from the first floor, a wraparound gallery led to a balcony resting on the pillars of the loggia. The villa was situated on a slope facing the beach, offering excellent views of the Øresund strait and the Swedish coast.

== List of former owners ==
- 1910-1916: Lorenz Beijer, Swedish merchant.
- 1916-1926: Andreas Erlandsen, merchant and shipowner.
- 1926-1956: Artom Rand, founder, director and owner of Copenhagen Fruit Auctions.
- 1956-1960: Rigmor Rand (née Aller), widow of above.
- 1960-1961: Arp Hansen, a local master builder.
- 1961-1966: Ministry of Culture of Denmark.

== Gallery ==
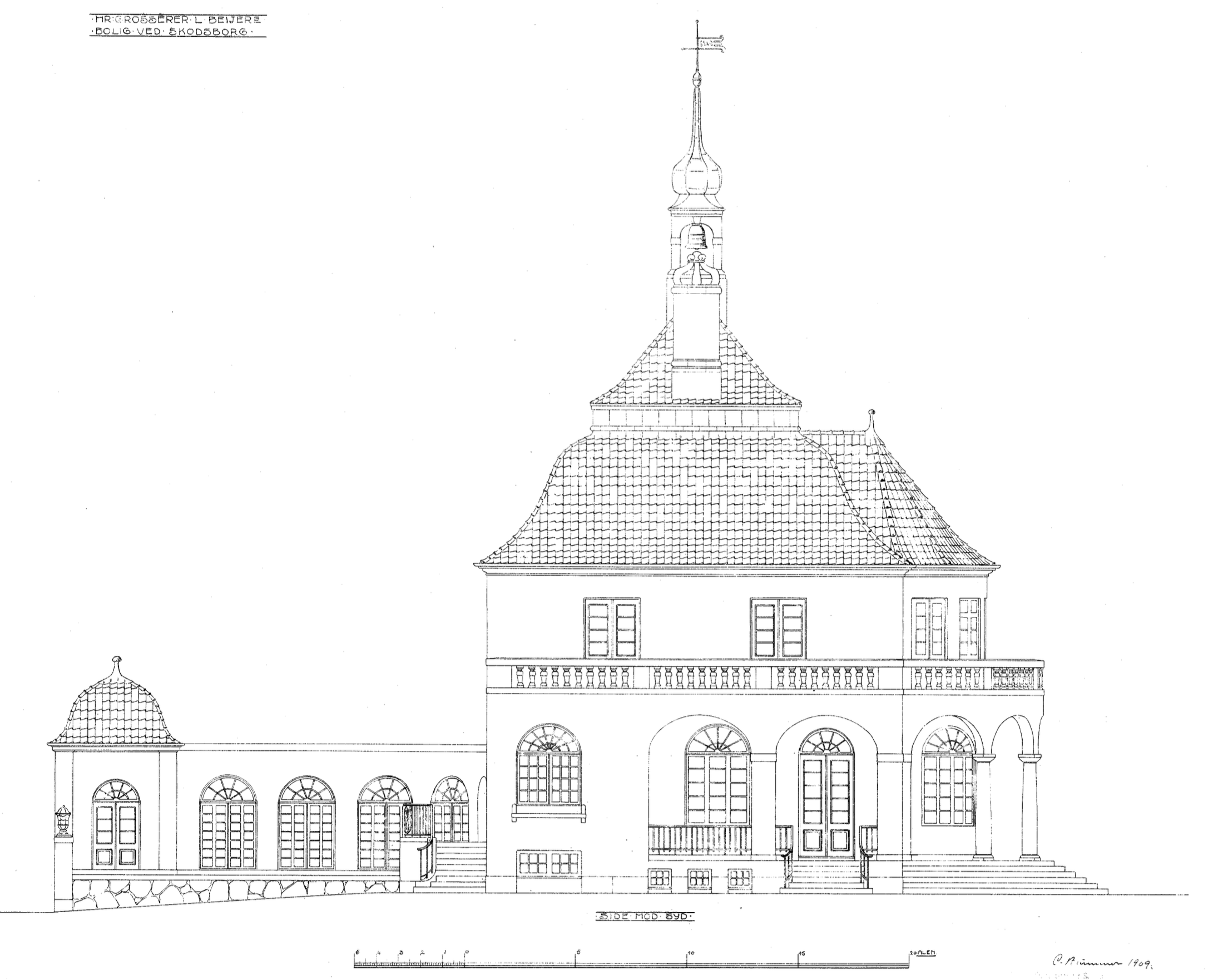
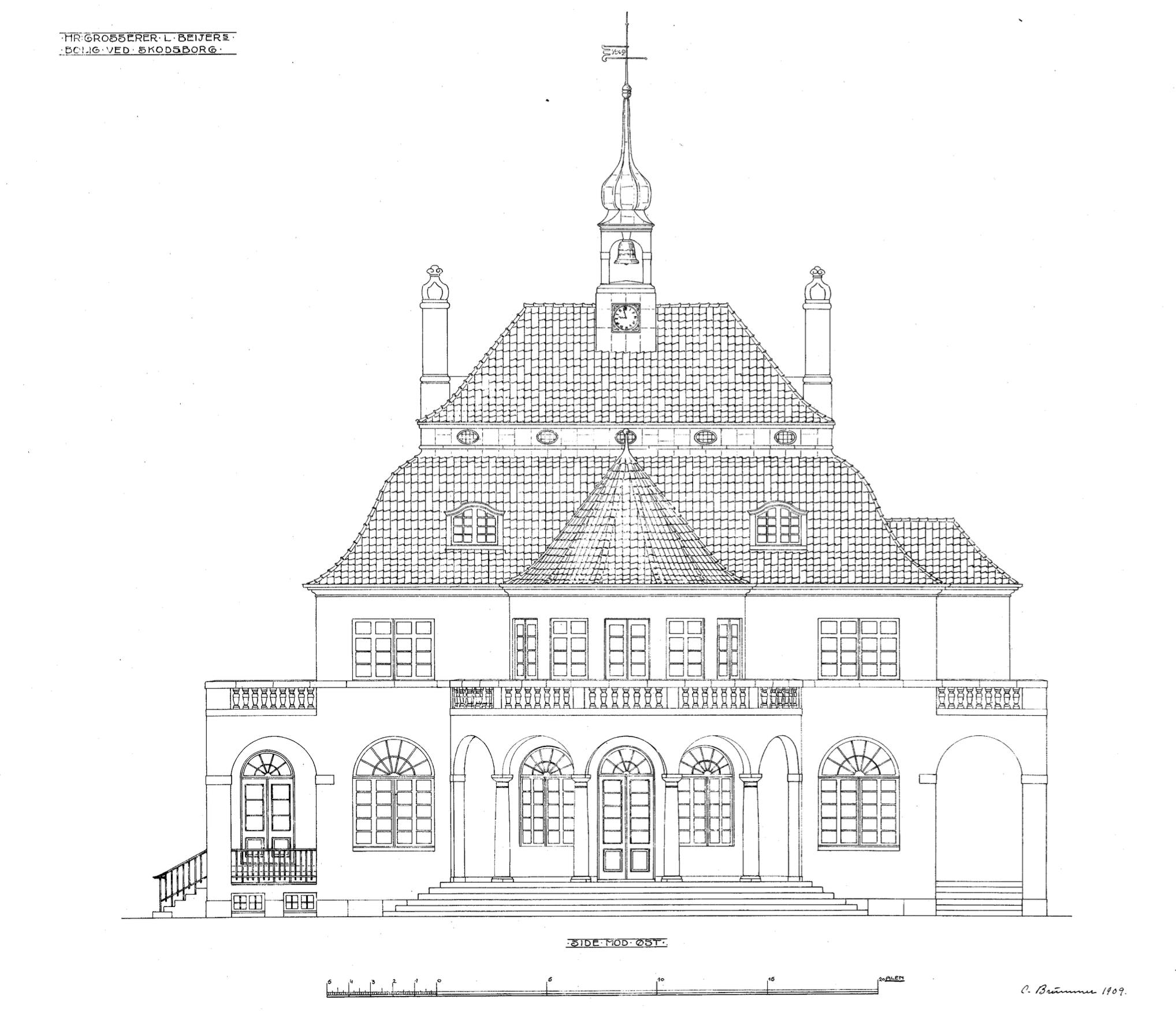
Architectural concept drawings of Villa Birkeborg, designed by architect Carl Brummer (1909).
