= Carl Brummer =

Danish architect

Carl Harald Brummer
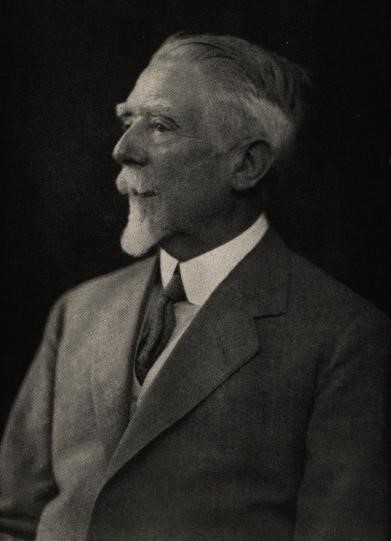
- Portrait of Carl Brummer.
- Born: 12 July 1864; Bogense, Denmark
- Died: 14 February 1953 (aged 88); Skovshoved, Denmark
- Occupation: architect
- Known for: Influential in home designs in Denmark at the beginning of the 20th century

Signature
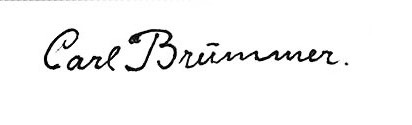

Carl Harald Brummer (12 July 1864 – 14 February 1953) was a Danish architect who was influential in the design of homes at the beginning of the 20th century.

== Early life and education ==
Brummer was born in Bogense as the son of Hans Frederik Brummer and Ida Amalie Christensen. His father leased the Oregaard estate. He was the nephew of railway pioneer Nicolai Abraham Brummer and author Therese Brummer and the cousin of railway engineer Valdemar Brummer.

Carl Brummer was initially trained as a carpenter. Heattended the Danish Academy from 1888 to 1896.

== Career ==
Brummer started his career by workeing for Ferdinand Meldahl and Hermann Baagøe Storck. He initially became known for Ellestuen, a freely designed country home which was quite different from conventional houses in Denmark. He soon became one of the leading Danish architects for designing private homes between the beginning of the 20th century and the First World War including Svanemøllevej 56 (1904) and Lundevangsvej 12 (1908), both in Copenhagen. He also drew on architecture from the late 18th century, for example in designing Heymans Villa in 1907 before adopting the Neoclassical style and experimenting with other approaches including simplified Functional designs which can be seen in Gurre Church (1918) and his own home (1920). In 1911, he won the Eckersberg Medal for being the architect behind Birkeborg, a country house on the Øresund coast north of Copenhagen. He died, aged 88, in Skovshoved.

== Personal life ==
Brummer was married to the painter Benedicte Brummer (née Olrik). They were wed on 8 April 1910 in the Immanuel Church in Copenhagen. His wife was a daughter of painter and sculptor Henrik Olrik and Hermina Valentiner and the younger sister of weaver Dagmar Olrik, historian Hans Olrik and folklorist Axel Olrik. Her mother's maternal grandfather was the landowner Heinrich Valentiner and the mathematician Herman Valentiner was her cousin.

Brummer was created a knight in the Order of the Dannebrog in 1927. He was awarded the Cross of Honour in 1933. He published his memoirs as Mennesker, Huse – og Hunde (1949).

== Selected projects ==
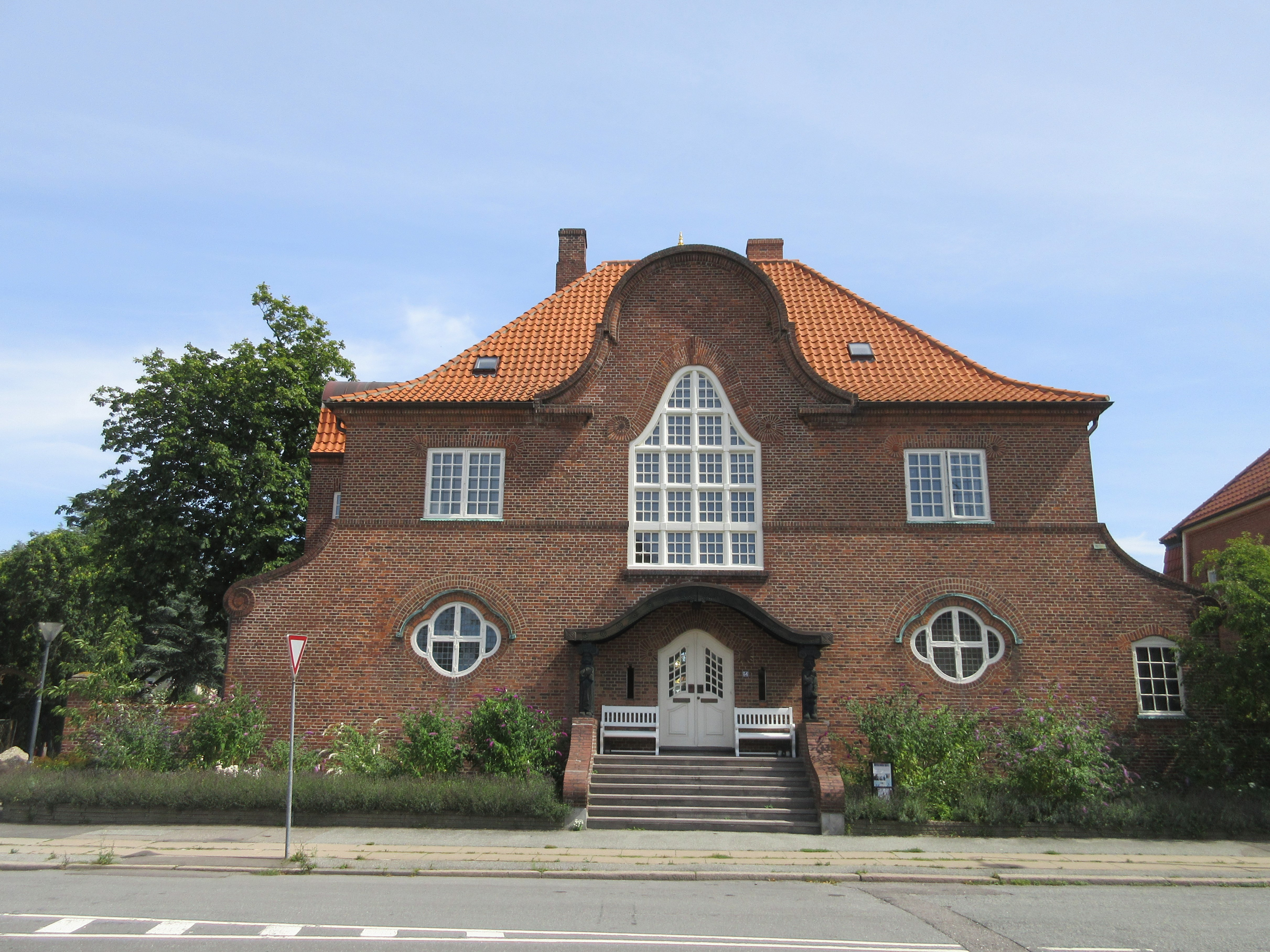
Svanemøllevej 56, Copenhagen (1904)

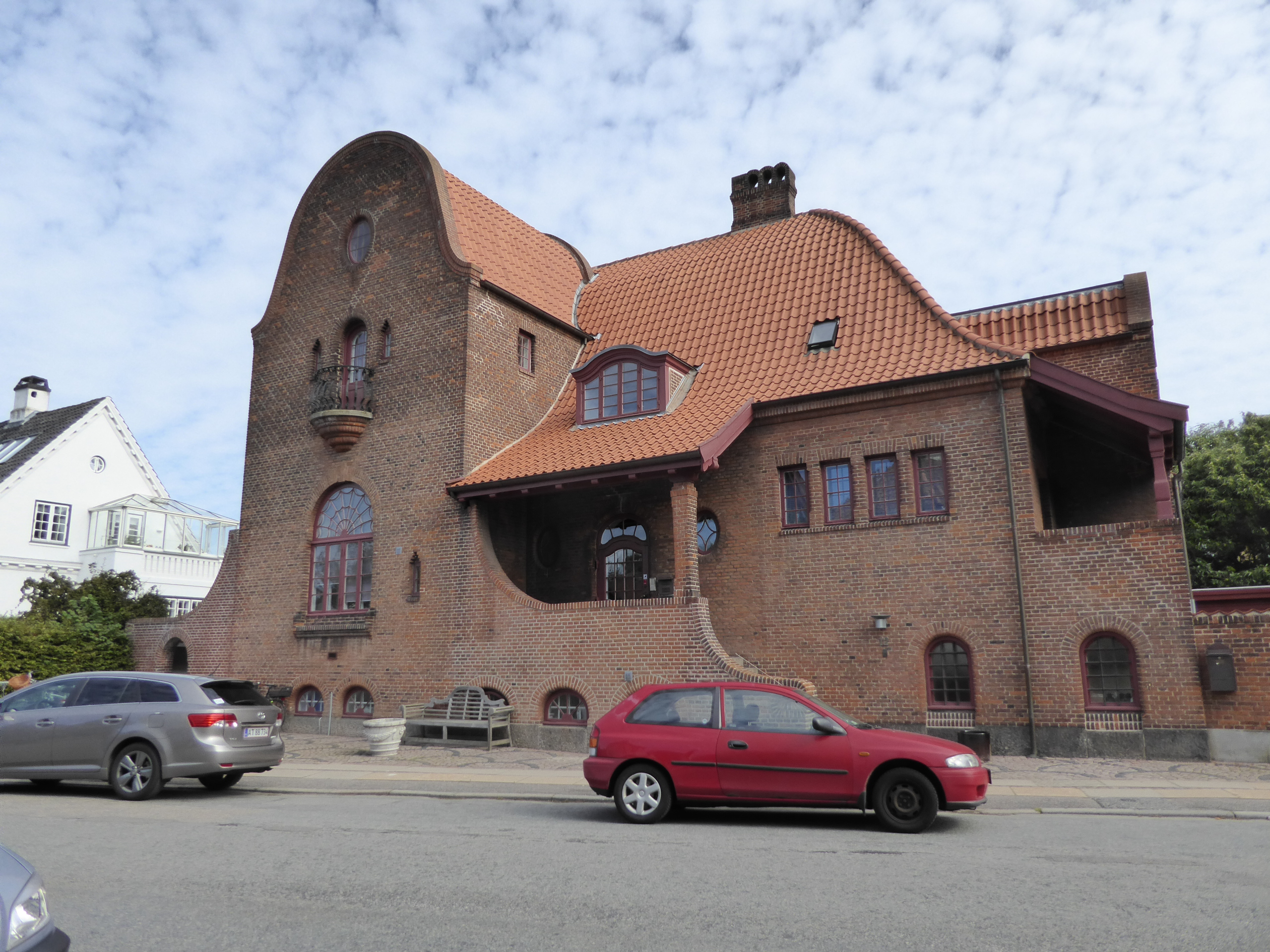
Lundevangsvej 12, Copenhagen (1908)

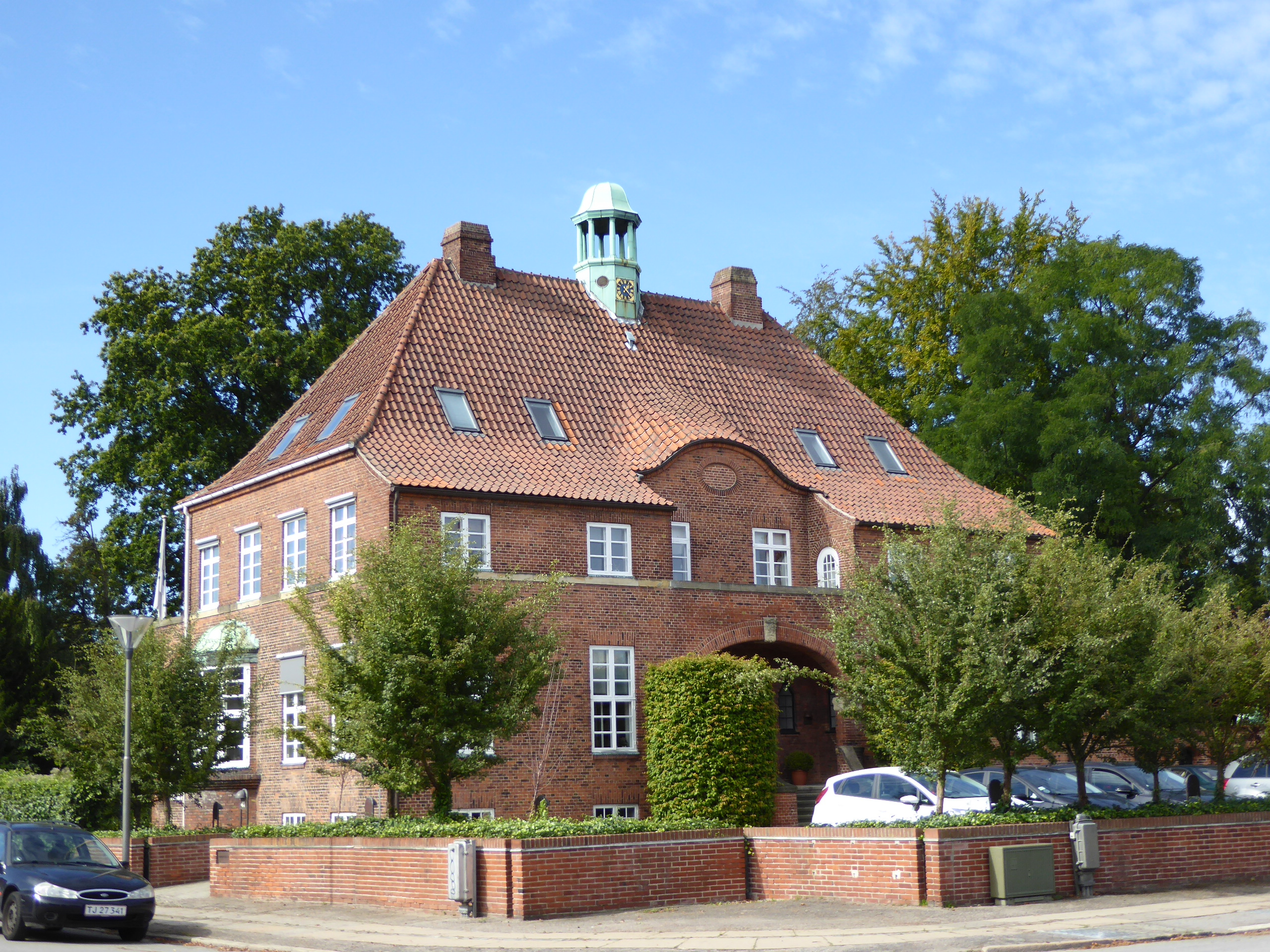
Svanemøllevej 41, Vopenhagen (1910)

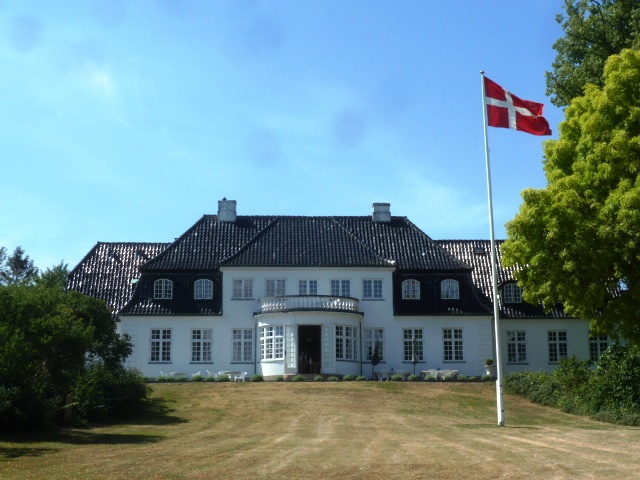
Bakkehuset, Vedbæk (1816).

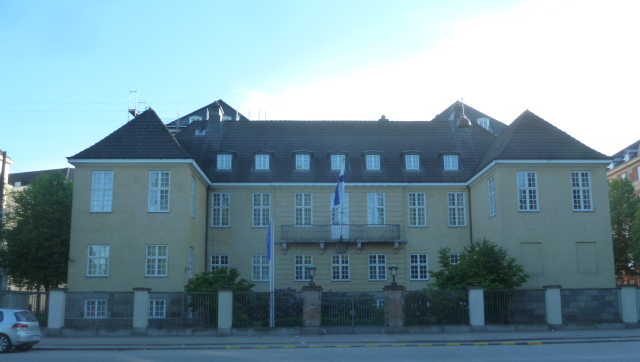
Hagemann Mansion, Copenhagen

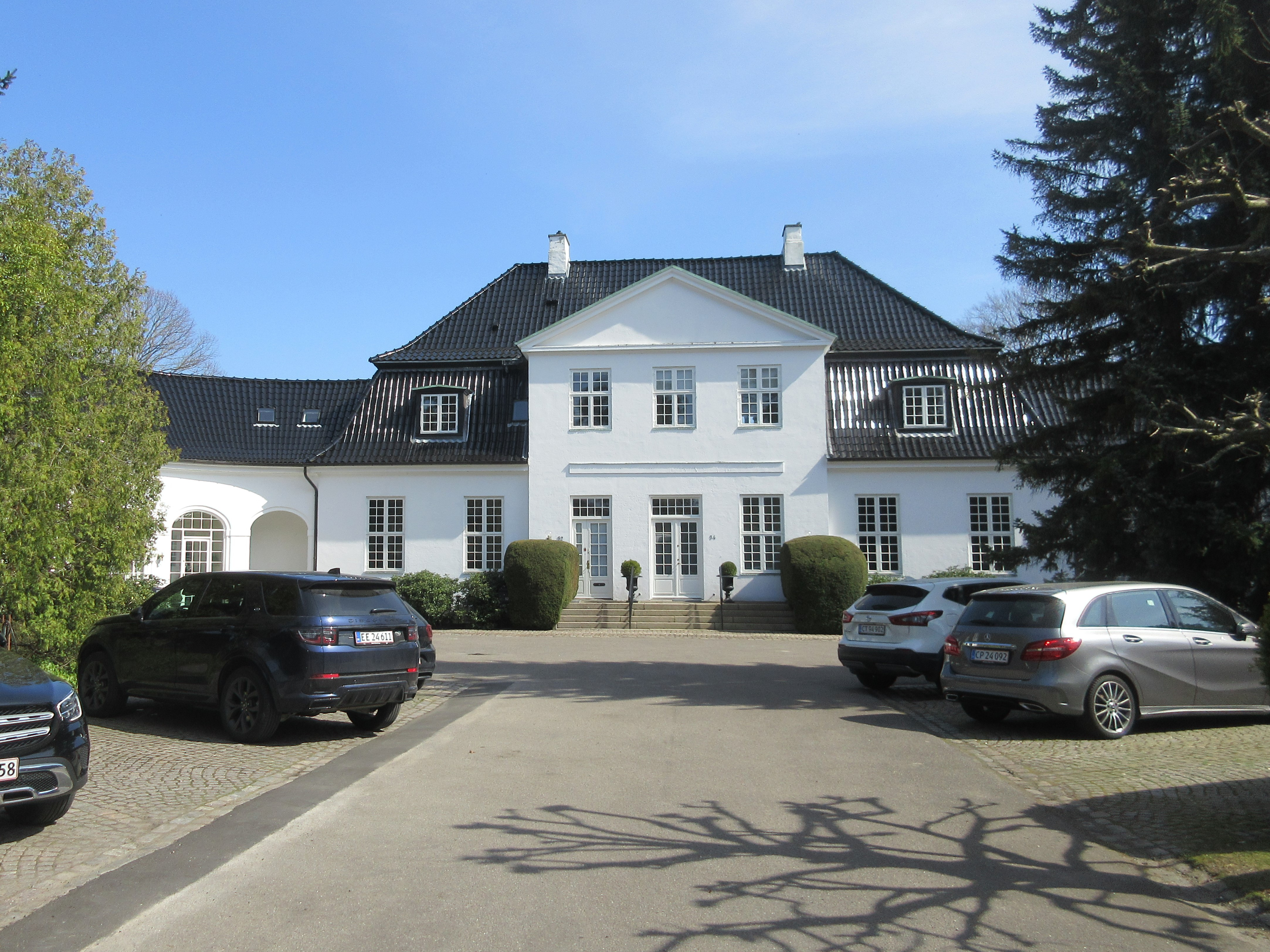
Christiansgave, Rungsted (1918)-

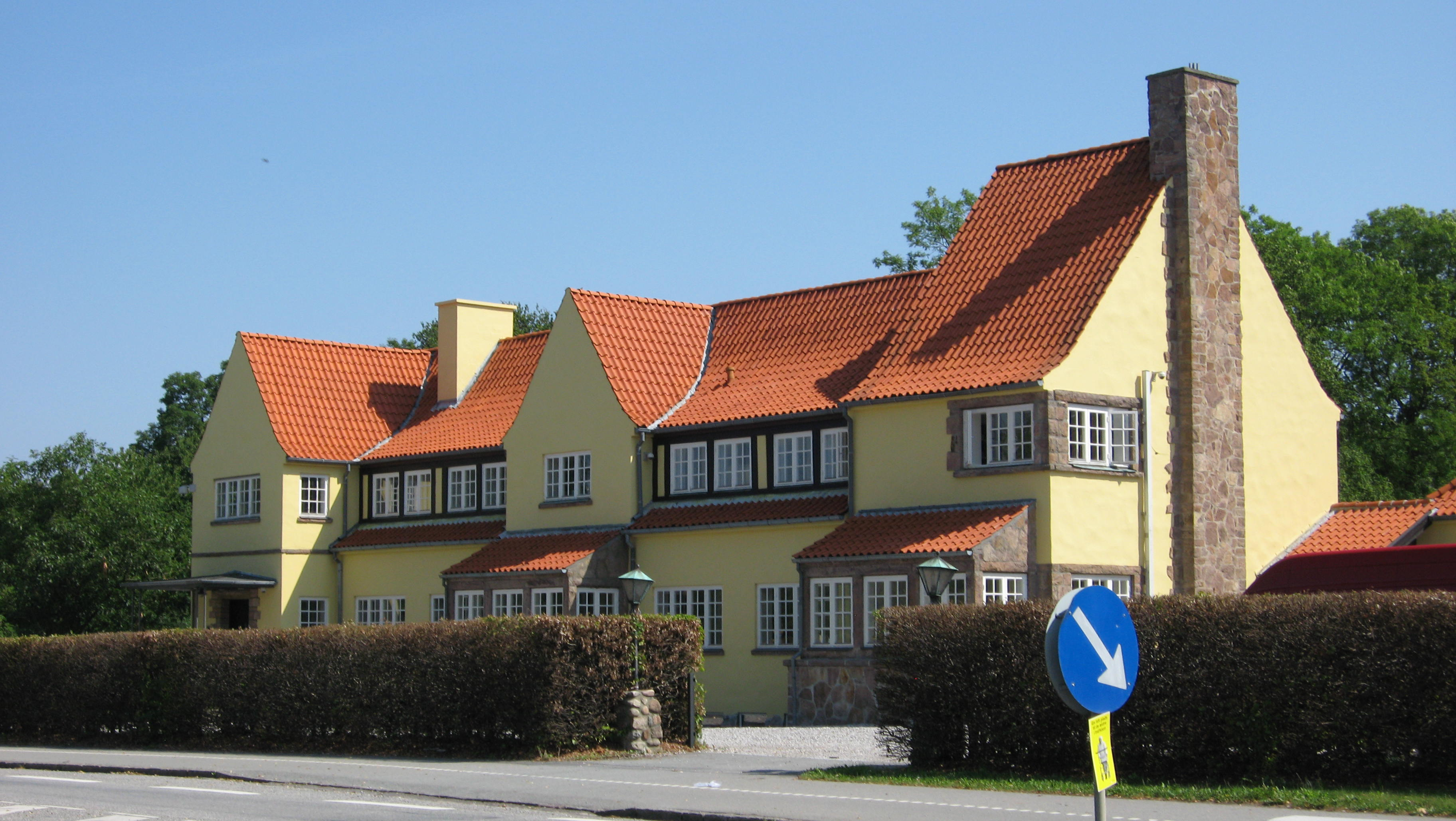
Køllesgaard, Humlebæk.

- Ellestuen, Hellebæk (1895)
- Villa Rica for Siegfried Wagner, Lottenborgvej 21, Kongens Lyngby (1896, rebuilt 1964 by Kay Fisker)
- Villa Peberbøssen, Bergensgade (1896)
- Nazarethkirken, Ryslinge (1898, adaption of church from 1866)
- House for Axel Henriques, now Willis A/S, Tuborgvej 5 (1903, altered)
- House for Ivar Knudsen, now Buddhistisk Center København, Svanemøllevej 56, Ryvangen (1904)
- Restoration of Hellerupgård, Hellerup (1904, demolished 1954)
- Holstebro Valgmenighedskirke, Holstebro (1905)
- House for Aage Heyman, Strandvejen 93/Rosbæksvej, Ryvangen (1907, awarded Eckersberg Medall)
- Det norske Hus, Carlsminde park, Søllerød, moved to Rudegårds Allé 7c (1907)
- House for Harry Dessau, Odense (1907)
- Hartmanns villa, St. Amandsberg, Ghent (1907)
- Restoration of Frydenlund, Trørød (1908, with V.J. Mørk-Hansen)
- House for A.C. Illum, Hveensvej 6, Vedbæk (1908–12, nedrevet, demolished), Sofievej 1)
- House for Christian Gulmann, Vestagervej 7, Ryvangen (1908)
- House for Ernst Møller, Lundevangsvej 12, Ryvangen (1908, listed)
- Villa Søholt for Otto Meyer, Taarbæk Strandvej 20, Tårbæk (1908–09)
- Villa Birkeborg, Skodsborg (1909–10, demolished 1961)
- House for Valdemar Ludvigsen, now De Samvirkende Købmænd, Svanemøllevej 41 (1910, Eckersberg Medal 1911)
- Konsul Ditlev Lauritzens hus, Scherfigsvej 9 (1914)
- House for Maas, Frohnau, Berlin (1914)
- Buildings in Wildersgade for Burmeister & Wain (1916)
- Bakkehuset, Vedbæk Strandvej 373, Vedbæk (1916, garden by Erik Erstad-Jørgensen)
- Restoration of Strandmøllen and wall in front of foran Drewsens Palæ (1917–20)
- House for Benny Dessau, Villingbæk (1918)
- Gurre Church (1918)
- Hagemann Mansion, Grønningen 11 (1918)
- Simonsen Mansion, Dag Hammarskjölds Allé 28 (1918)
- Christiansgave, Rungsted Strandvej 50, Smidstrup (1918)
- Smidstrupøre, Smidstrupørevej 10, Smidstrup (1918)
- Brummer's own house, Dyrehavevej 32, Klampenborg (1920)
- Gamlehave, later Geodætisk Institut, Gamlehave Allé 22, Ordrup (1920, with Thorkild Henningsen)
- Spædbørnhjemmet Danmark, Klampenborg (1922)
- Statens Gymnastikinstitut, now Institut for Idræt, University of Copenhagen, Nørre Allé (1922)
- Bispegården, Haderslev (1924)
- House, Dyrehavevej 46, Klampenborg (1924)
- Apartment block, Lyngbyvej (1926)
- Det Danske Sømandshjem, Ghent (1927)
- Kjøbenhavns Handelsbank, Vingårdsstræde/Laksegade (1927–28)
- House of Unitarians, Dag Hammarskjölds Allé 30 (1928)
- Rønhave, now Det Apostoliske Nuntiatur, Immortellevej 11, Vedbæk (1929)
- Københavns Handelsbank, Holmens Kanal, and adaption of Frederik Levy's building (1928–30)
- Pavillon for dansk Kunst, Biennalen, Venice (1931)
- Kølles Gård, Gammel Strandvej, Humlebæk (1932)
- Skovriderbolig Dybvad (1933)
- House, Herredsvej 42, Gentofte (1933)
- Lejrskole, Buresø (Buehus) (1935)
- House for H.O. Lange, Holte (1935)
- Restoration of Tikøb Church (1942)

== See also ==
- List of Danish architects
