= Lundevangsvej 12 =

Villa in Copenhagen, Denmark

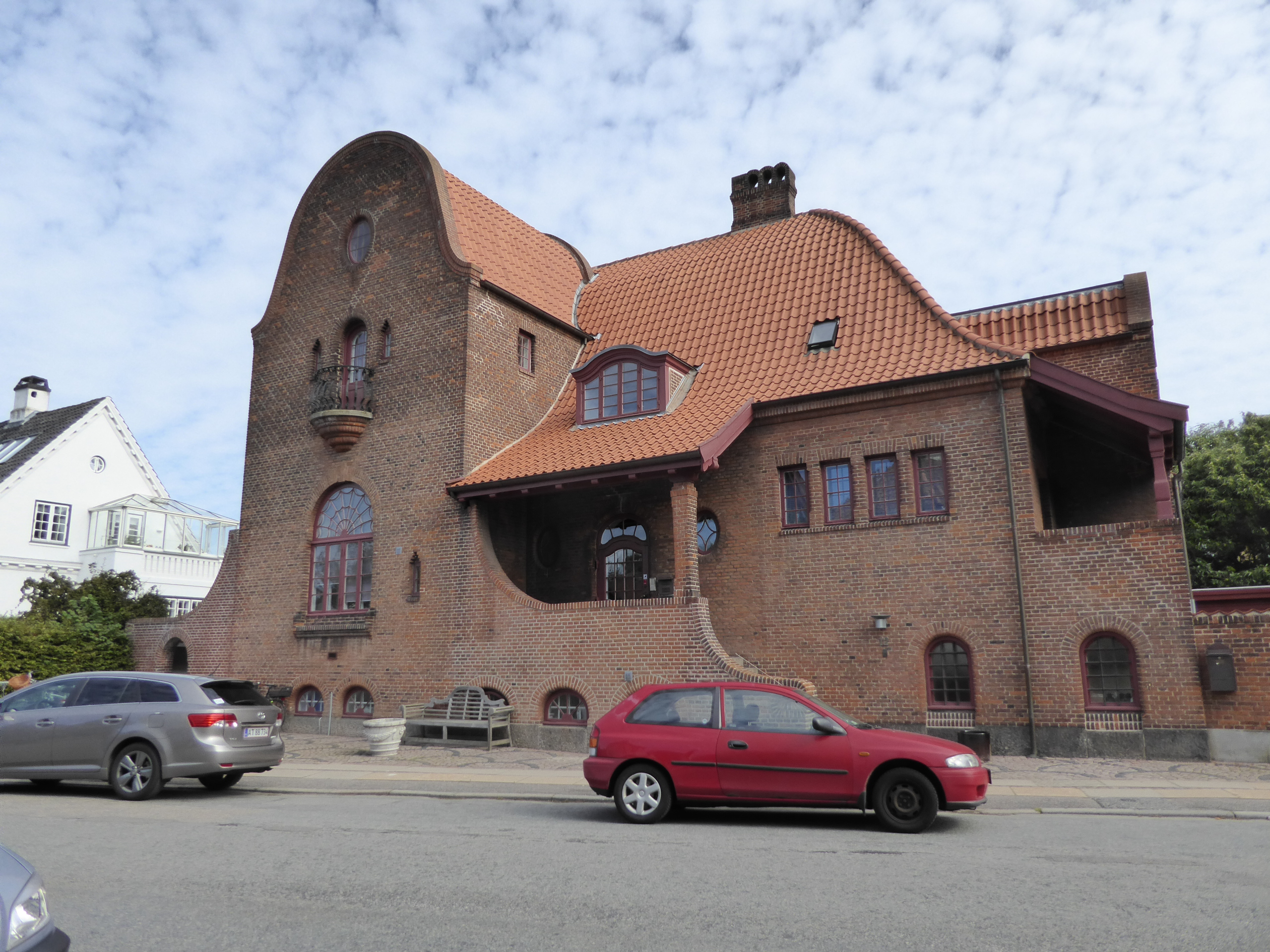
- Interactive map of the Lundevangsvej 12 area

General information
- Location: Hellerup, Copenhagen, Lundevangsvej 12, 2900 Hellerup, Denmark
- Coordinates: 55°43′30.47″N 12°34′16.54″E
- Construction started: 1908

Design and construction
- Architect: Carl Brummer

Lundevangsvej 12 is a Carl Brummer-designed villa in the Ryvangen quarter of Copenhagen, Denmark. It was listed in the Danish registry of protected buildings and places in 1995. Metallica drummer and co-founder Lars Ulrich lived in the house for the first 17 years of his life.

== History ==
Watercolour by Brummer.

The house was constructed in 1908 for Supreme Court attorney Ernst Møller. The architect Carl Brummer was charged with designing the building. It was constructed by master mason Johannes Jensen. Brummer was also responsible for designing Ivar Knudsen's house at Svanemøllevej 56 (1904), Aage Heyman's house at Strandvejen 93 and Christian Gulmann's house at Vestagervej 7 (1008) in the same neighborhood.

In the 1940s, Lundevangsvej 12 was the home of Erna Hamilton.

The house was later owned by business executive Sylvester Hvid. The house was later taken over by his daughter Lone and son-in-law Torben Ulrich. Lars Ulrich lived in the house for the first 17 years of his life.

The house was listed in the Danish registry of protected buildings and places by the Danish Heritage Agency on 7 February 1995.
