= Bernstorff Mansion =

Building in Copenhagen, Denmark

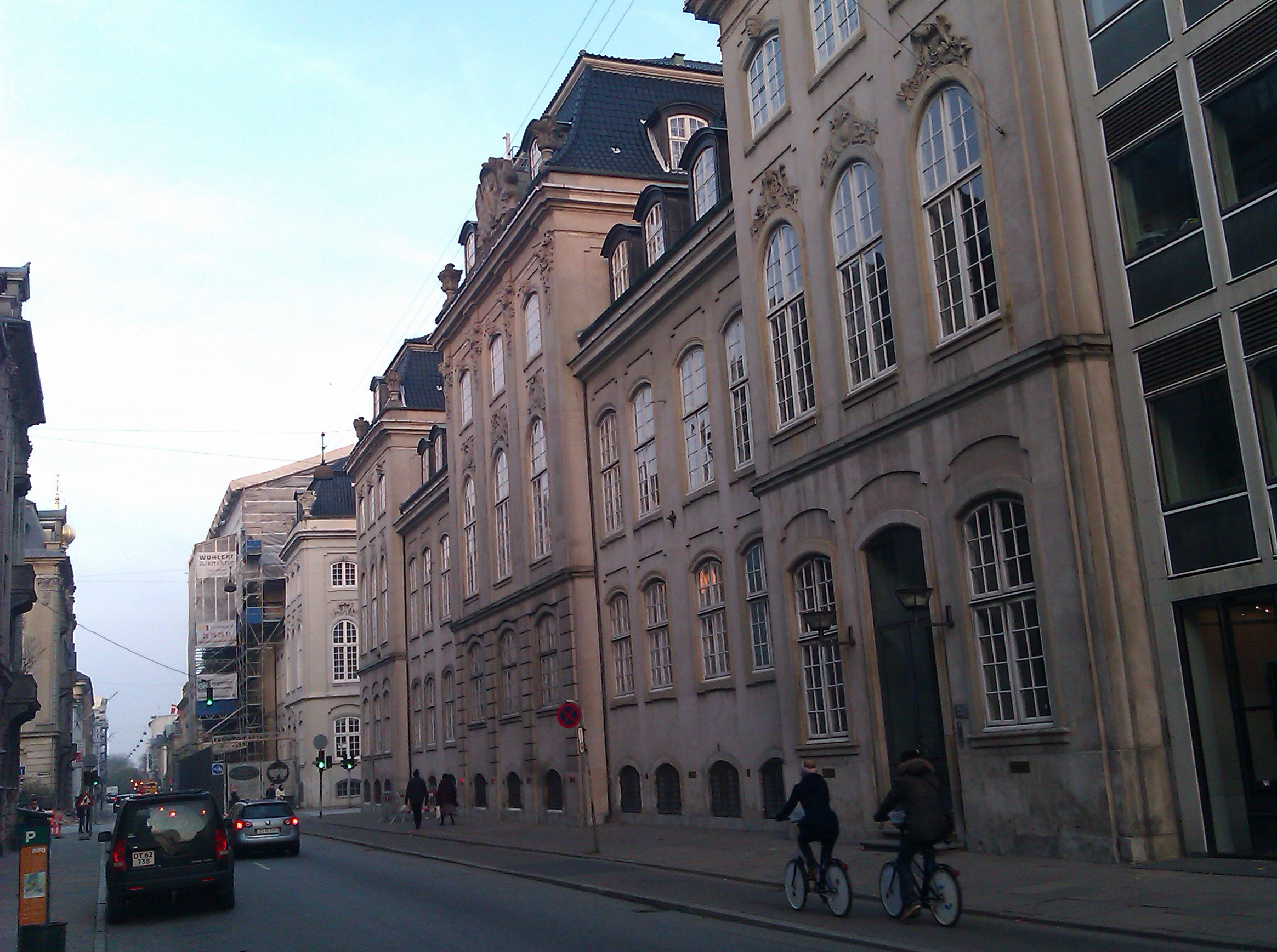
- Interactive map of the Bernstorff Mansion area

General information
- Architectural style: Rococo
- Location: Copenhagen, Denmark
- Coordinates: 55°41′2.94″N 12°35′25.12″E
- Completed: 1752–56

Design and construction
- Architect: Johann Gottfried Rosenberg

The Bernstorff Mansion (Danish: Bernstorffske Palæ) is a Rococo-style town mansion situated at the corner of Bredgade and Frederiksgade in the Frederiksstaden district of central Copenhagen, Denmark. It complements the Dehn Mansion on the other corner, contributing to the symmetry of Frederiksstaden's Frederiksgade axis. The town mansion remained in the hands of the Bernstorff family until 1799. It has also been referred to as Prince Ferdinand's Mansion (Danish: Prins Ferdinands Palæ) and King George's Mansion (Danish: Kong Georges Palæ) after two later owners. The Supreme Court was based on the beletage from the fire of the second Christiansborg Palace in 1884 until the completion of its current building in 1919. Four large gobelins by François Boucher were sold in around 1900 and are now in the collection of the Metropolitan Museum. The building was listed on the Danish registry of protected buildings and places in 1918. It is now owned by Jeudan.

== History ==
=== Bernstorff family ===
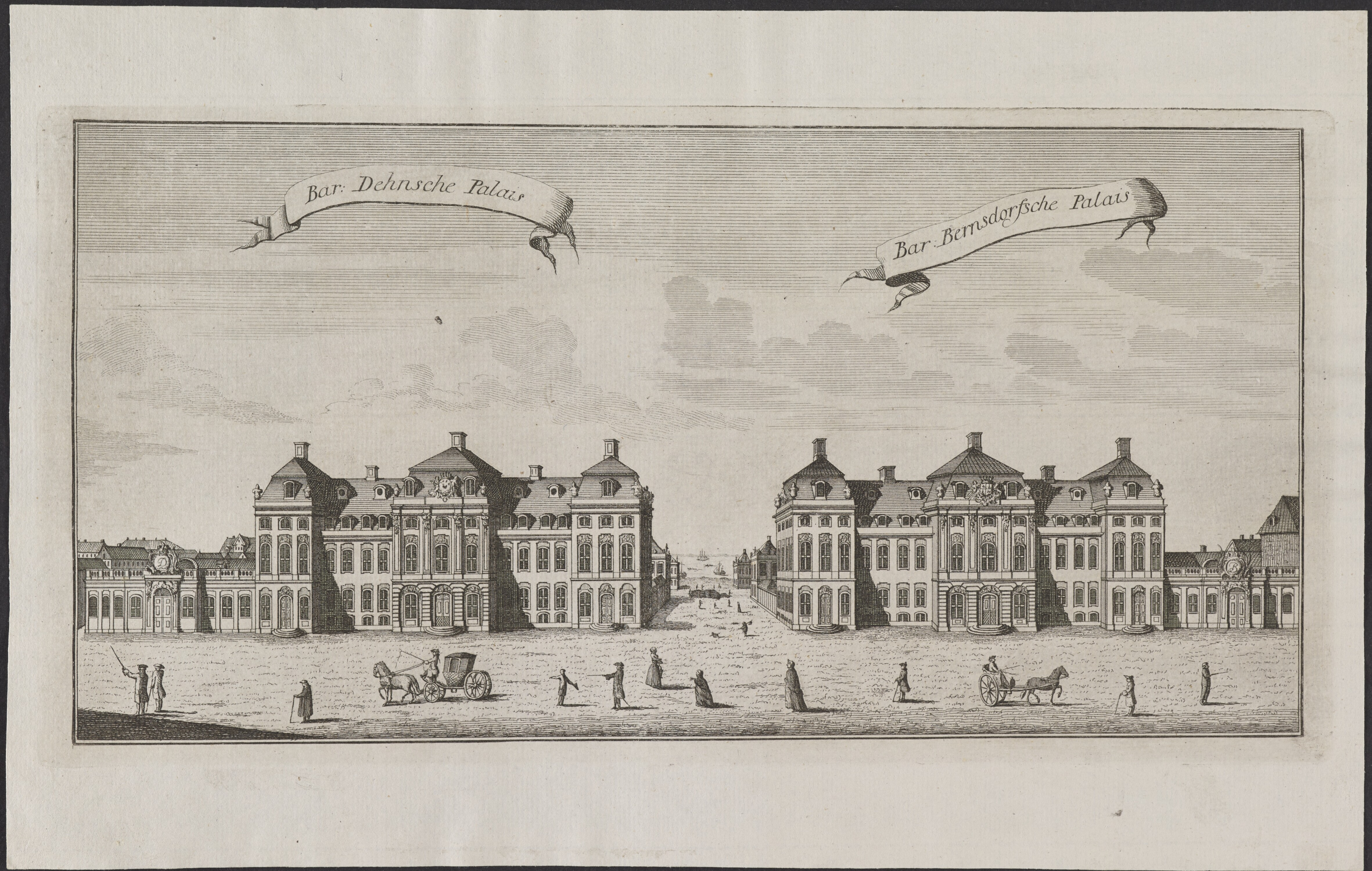
The Bernstorff Mansion (right) and the Dehn Mansion (left).

Nicolai Eigtved's masterplan for Copenhagen's new Frederiksstaden district was presented in 1749. The four most prestigious lots were those of the four Amalienborg mansions that would surround the central, octagonal plaza of the new district. Then followed the two lots at the corners of the axially symmetric street Frederiksgade that marked the entrance to Amalienborg from Norgesgade (now Bredgade). In return for 30 years of freedom from property taxes, the two privy councilors Frederik Ludvig von Dehn and Count Johann Hartwig Ernst von Bernstorff committed themselves to building the two identical town mansions that were called for in Eigtved's masterplan.

Bernstorff and Dehn commissioned the architect Johann Gottfried Rosenberg to design and construct the two buildings. Dehn had possibly already used Rosenberg for the design of Gut Ludwigsburg in Schleswig. The plans were approved by Eigtved in 1753 and the Bernstorff Mansion was completed in 1756.

The property was marked No. 298 on Christian Gedde's map of St. Ann's Quarter. It was later referred to as No. 71 OO.

The mansion was after Bernstorff's death in 1772 passed to his nephew Andreas Peter Bernstorff. His property was home to five households at the 1787 census. Andreas Petrus Bernstorff resided in the building with his wife Augusta Lowisa (née Stolberg), their six children (aged six to 20) and the hovmester Ferdinant Kock. Their staff comprised 38 people. Jens Jørgensen, a courier at the Royal Danish Library, resided in the building with his wife Sara Hillebrand and their five-year-old son Johan Daniel Jørgensen. Johan Friderick Baumgarten, an inspector at the Class Lottery, resided in the building with his wife Dorothea Friderica, their daughter Ide Hedevig, one maid and one female cook.

After his death in 1797, the building was passed to his son Joachim Bernstorff.

=== Changing owners, 1796–1813 ===
The property was acquired by Jørgen Henrich Rawert and Andreas Hallander in 1799. It was subsequently divided into three residences.

The northern part of the mansion was sold to the landowner Frederik Hoppe. The southern part of the mansion belonged to Steen Andersen Bille from 1803. The property was listed in the new cadastre of 1806 as No. 177 in St. Ann's East Quarter.

The central part of the mansion belonged to Prince Ferdinand from 1813.

=== Ferdinand and Caroline, 1828–1881 ===
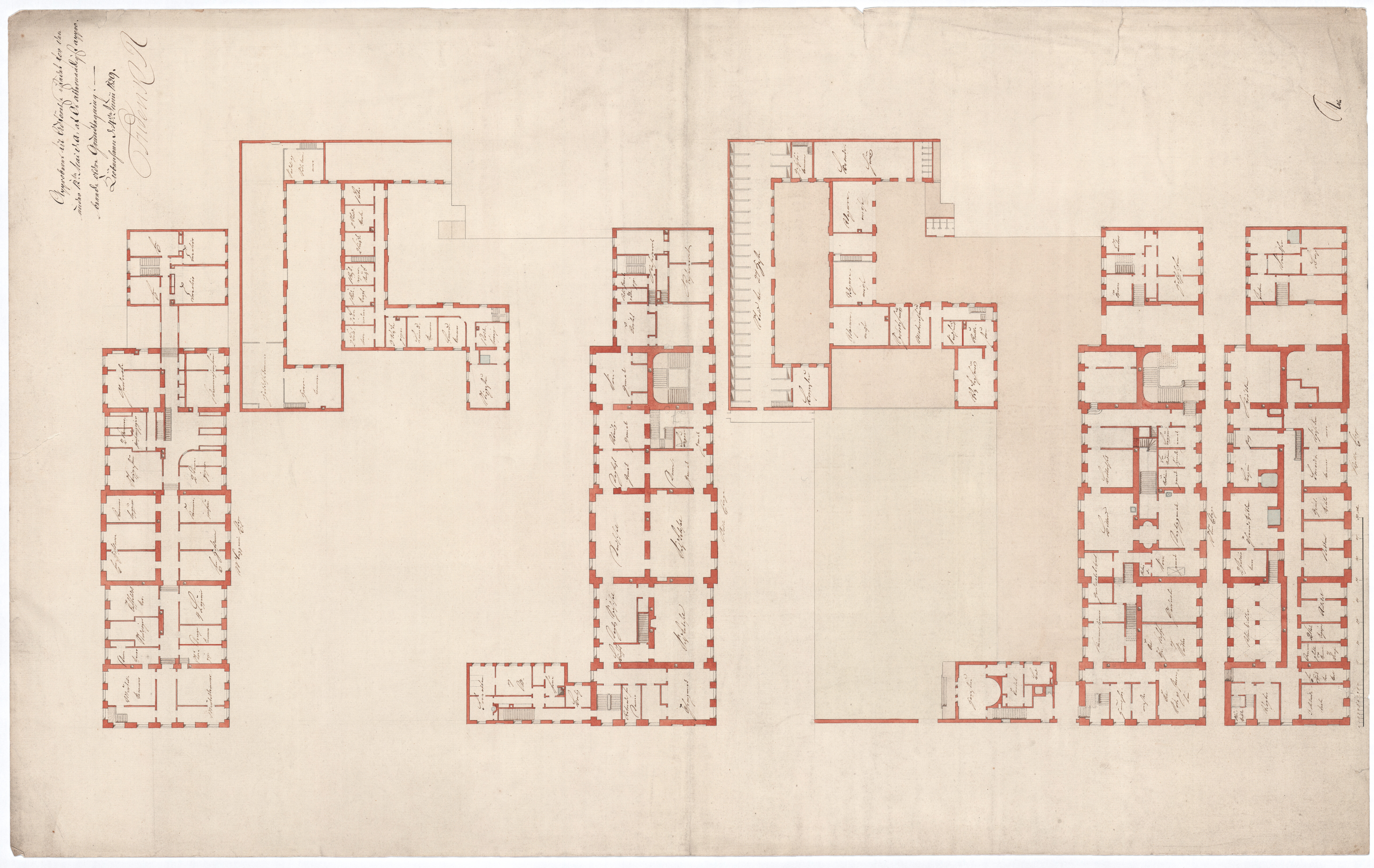
Rendering by Jørgen Hansen Koch, 1829.

In 1829, Frederick VI purchased the entire building and presented it to Ferdinand, Hereditary Prince of Denmark, in conjunction with his wedding to Frederick VI's daughter Caroline. It replaced the Holstein Mansion which he had first bought for them. The mansion was subsequently renovated by Jørgen Hansen Koch.

Prince Ferdinand died in 1863. Princess Caroline kept the building until her death in 1881.

=== George I of Greece, 1881–1915 ===
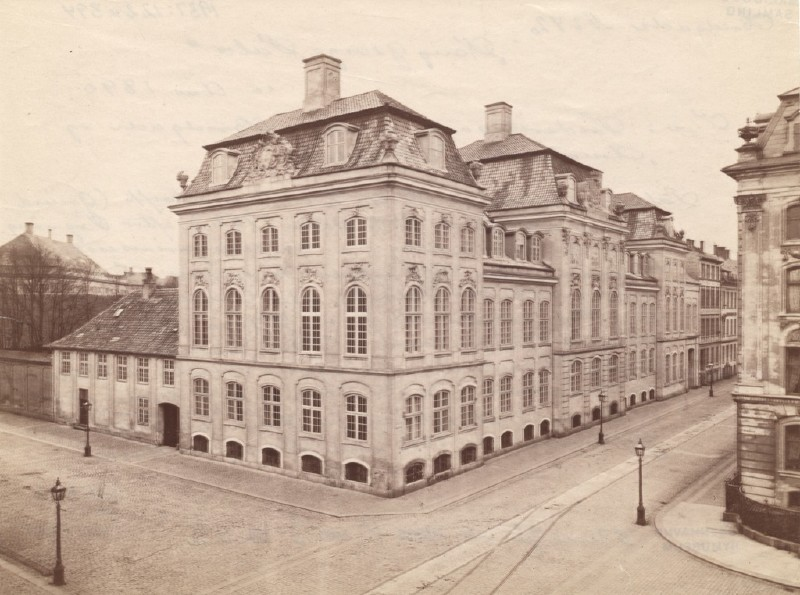
King George's Mansion.

In 1881, George I of Greece purchased the mansion for c. KK 357,000.

The Supreme Court found a temporary home on the beletage following the fire of Christiansborg Palace. The first meeting took place on 21 October 1884.

Prince Carl (later Haakon VII of Norway) resided on the ground floor following his wedding marriage to Princess Maud in 1897.

=== Company headquarters ===
The property was acquired by Transatlantisk Kompagni in 1916. In 1921, it was acquired by the Baltica insurance company. In 1995, it was acquired by the Tryg-Vesta insurance company.

== Architecture ==
The building was designed in the Rococo style by J. G. Rosenberg but approved by the Court master builder Nicolai Eigtved, who was responsible for the overall supervision of the new town district of Frederikstad. The principal facade towards Bredgade consists of three three-storey pavilions connected to each other by lower two-storey sections. The three pavilions are constructed with three storeys over a walk-out basement and are topped by Mansard roofs. The piano nobile, the main floor, has tall round-arched windows with rich decorations above, vases and cartouches on the ceilings. The central pavilion is decorated with pilasters with richly decorated capitals and grooves at the ground floor level. All facades have "ear" lesenes (i.e. small square "ears" at the top).

== Today ==
The building is owned by Jeudan and let out as office space.
