= Dehn Mansion =

Building in Copenhagen, Denmark

Thott Mansion
- Thotts Palæ
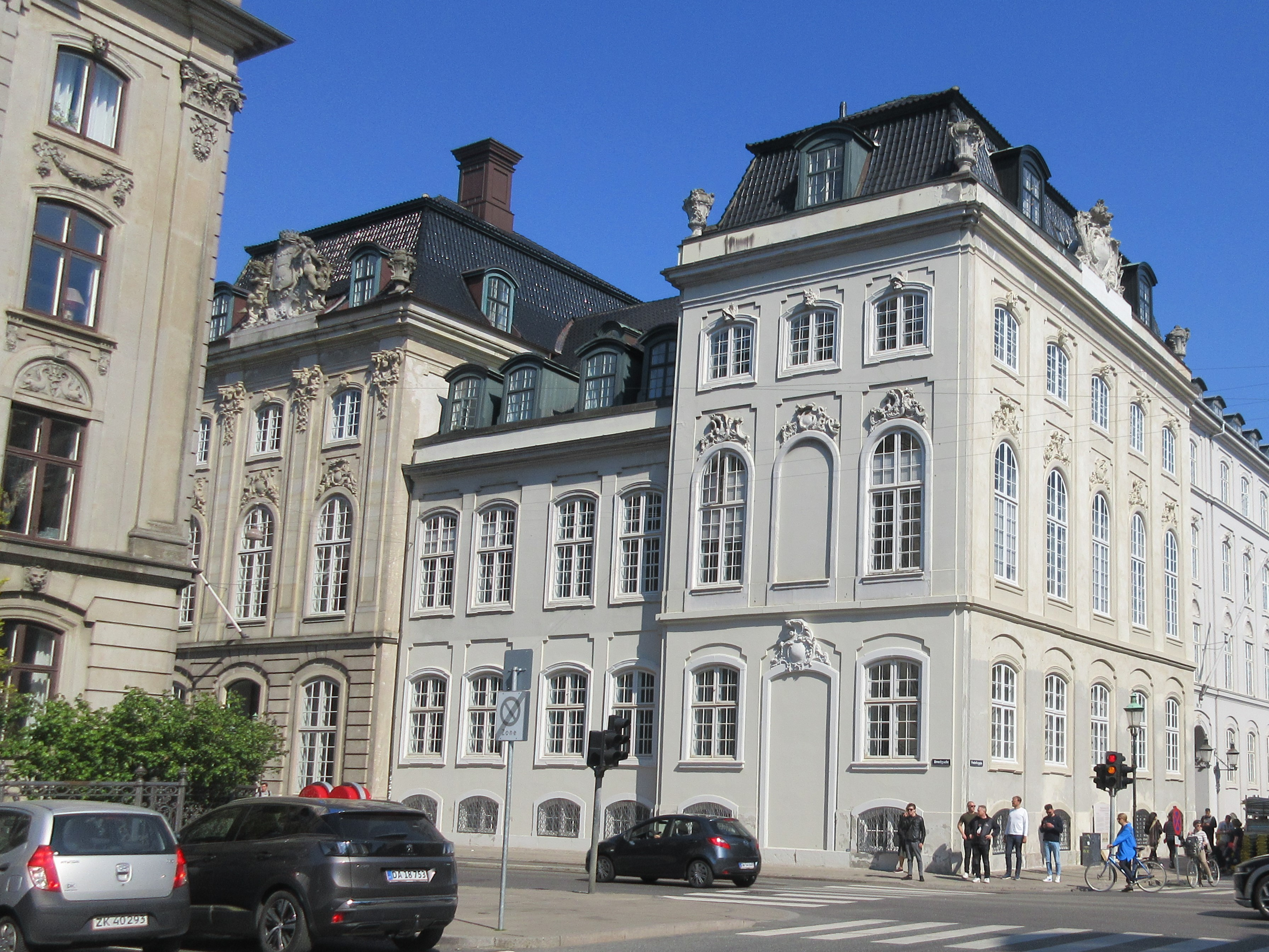
- The Dehn Mansion in 2023.
- Interactive map of the Thott Mansion area

General information
- Architectural style: Rococo
- Location: Copenhagen, Denmark
- Coordinates: 55°41′6.3″N 12°35′27.99″E
- Construction started: 1752
- Completed: 1756
- Client: Niels Juel
- Owner: State of France

Design and construction
- Architect: Johann Gottfried Rosenberg

The Dehn Mansion is one of two identical but mirror-imag Rococo-style town mansions on Bredgade, flanking the entrance to Amalienborg via Frederiksgade, in the Frederiksstaden district of Copenhagen, Denmark. It takes its name after Friedrich Ludwig von Dehn, its first owner. The mansion was later divided into two separate properties. The larger, northn part of the mansion is now owned by the Danish Association of Pharmaconomists. The southern part (Frederiksgade 17) is owned by Karberghus. The building was listed in the Danish registry of protected buildings and places in 1918.

== History ==
=== Friedrich Ludwig von Dehn ===
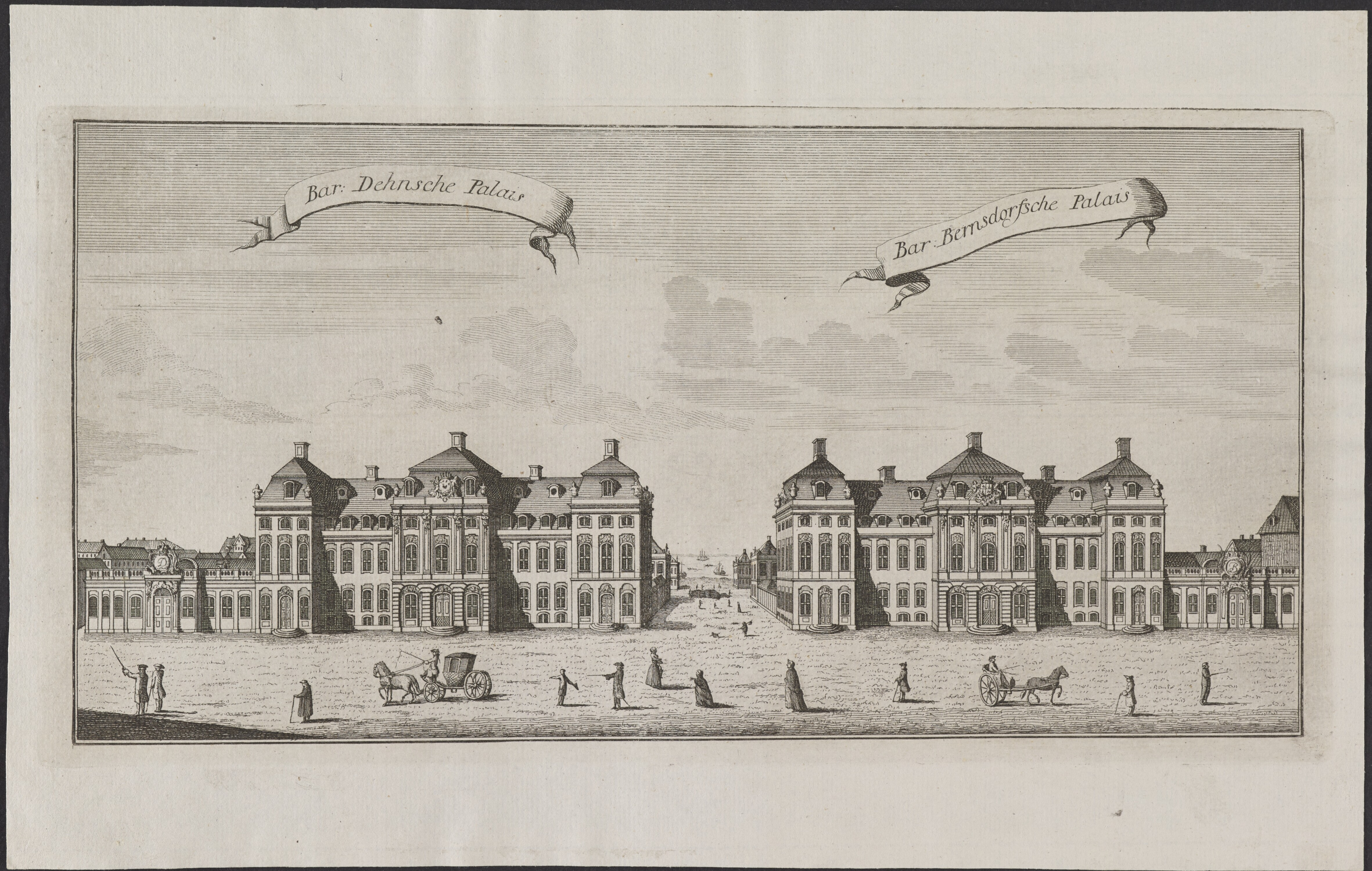
The Dehn Mansion and the Bernstorff Mansion.

Nicolai Eigtved's masterplan for Copenhagen's new Frederiksstaden district was presented in 1749. The four most prestigious lots were those of the four Amalienborg mansions that would surround the central, octagonal plaza of the new district. Then followed the two lots at the corners of the axially symmetric street Frederiksgade that marked the entrance to Amalienborg from Norgesgade (now Bredgade). In return for 30 years of freedom from property taxes, the two privy councilors Frederik Ludvig von Dehn and Count Johann Hartwig Ernst von Bernstorff committed themselves to building the two identical town mansions that were called for in Eigtved's masterplan.

Dehn and Bernstorff commissioned the architect Johann Gottfried Rosenberg to design and construct the two buildings. Dehn had possibly already used Rosenborg for the design of Gut Ludwigsburg in Schleswig. The plans were approved by Eigtved in 1753 and the Dehn Mansion was completed in 1755.

The property was listed as No. 71 NN in St. Ann's East Quarter. It is marked as No. 326 on Christian Gedde's map of St. Ann's East Quarter.

=== Reventlow family, 1766–1794 ===
Dehn was appointed to stadtholder in Schleswig-Holstein in 1762 and therefore ended up selling his town mansion in Copenhagen to Ditlev Reventlow in 1766. Reventlow passed it on to his son Fritz Reventlow in 1779.

=== Changing owners, 1794–1871 ===
In 1794, Reventlow sold the Dehn Mansion to Frederick Christian II, Duke of Schleswig-Holstein-Sonderburg-Augustenburg. He fell out of favour at the Danish court after the English Wars. In 1810 the mansion was purchased for speculative reasons by a consortium consisting of Frederik Julius Kaas, William Duntzfelt and Niels Rosenkrantz. They divided it into two separate properties. In 1811, they were sold to Carl Ludwig von Baudissin. He died in 1814.

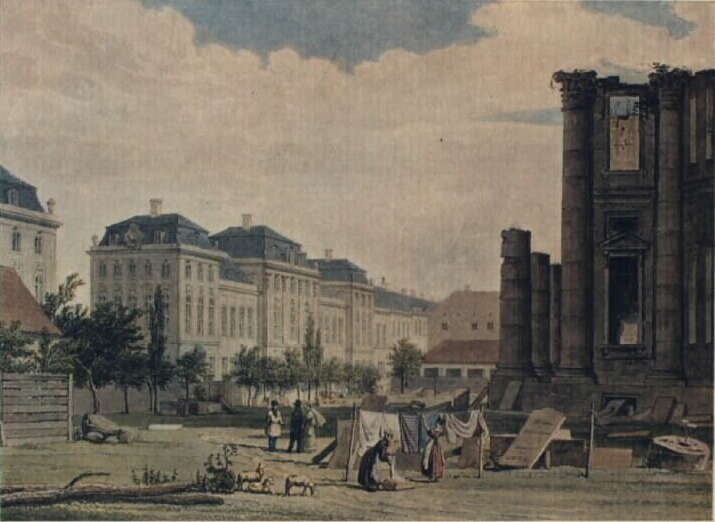
The Dehn Mansion painted by H. G. F. Holm in circa 1840

Christopher MacEvoy Jr., a merchant and planter from Saint Croix in the Danish West Indies, purchased the mansion in 1820. He had recently also purchased the Bernstorff Palace in Charlottenlund north of the city.

The Dehn Mansion changed hands several times after MacEvoy's death in 1838. At the 1840 census, No. 179A was home to 18 residents. Jonathan F. Woodside, who served as the Chargé d'affairs of the United States resided in the building with two maids, a female cook, a coachman, a stableman and a male servant.

In 1842 the property was acquired by Carl Frederik Blixen Finecke. His brother-in-law, Prince Frederick William of Hesse-Kassel, heir to the Danish throne until 1852, purchased the mansion in 1844. He rented the smaller, southern part of the building out, for instance to the writer Johan Ludvig Heiberg and his wife Johanne Luise Heiberg.

=== Knuth and Hornung & Møllerm 1871–1931 ===
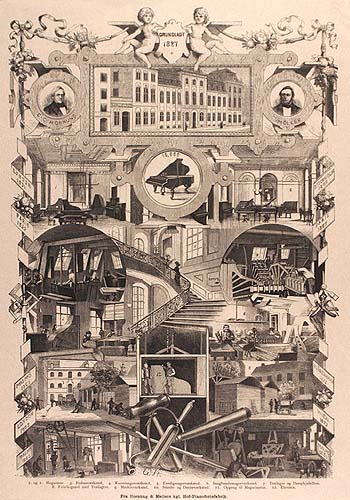
Hornung & Møller

In 1871 the northern and southern part of the mansion were for the first time sold to different buyers. The southern part was acquired by the Knuth family for Christopher Knuth. He owned it until his death in 1942, using it as his winter home while spending the summers on the Lilliendal estate at Vordingborg. The larger northern part of the mansion was acquired by piano manufacturer Frederik Møller. In 1900, it was ceded to Hornung & Møller.

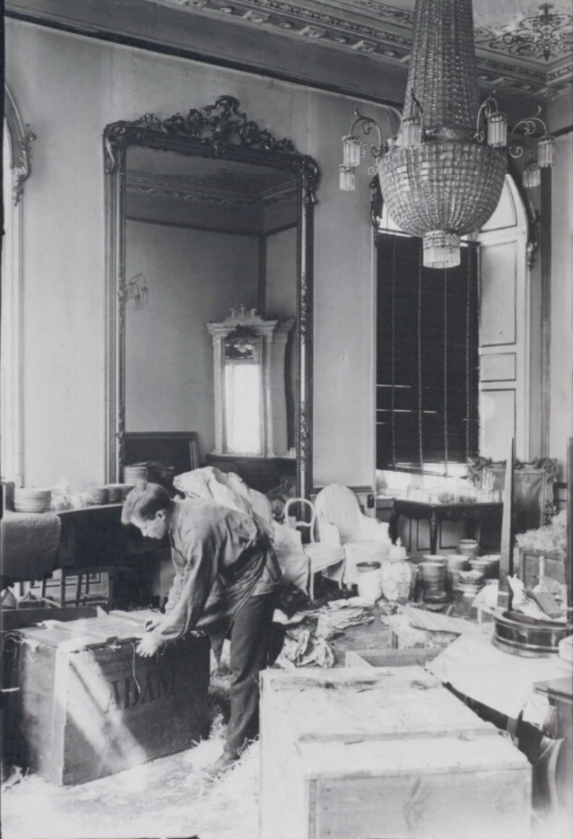
The Russian delegation in the process of moving out of their premises, 1919

The Russian diplomatic delegation in Copenhagen was also a tenant in the building but closed down in 1919.

=== Later history ===
The insurance company Nord & Syd acquired both parts of the mansion in 1942. Det Dansk-Franske Dampskibsselskab, a shipping company, acquired the building in 1956.

In 1976, the mansion was taken over by the state and put through a major renovation. The northern part was sold to Danish Association of Pharmaconomists in 1980.

two parts of the mansion were once again sold to different buyers. The northern part was taken over by the government and used for housing the Ministry of Environmental Affairs. The southern part has for instance housed the Danish Copyright Bureau.

In the night between 3 and 4 May 2010, a violent fire broke out in the roof of the mansion. On the night between May 4 and 5, the floors of the building collapsed completely, leaving only the outer walls intact. The mansion was then rebuilt in the same style before the fire.

== Architecture ==
The Dehn Mansion is designed in the Late Baroque/Rococo style. The main facades towards Bredgade consist of three three-storey pavilions with Mansard roofs connected by lower, two-storey sections.

The piano nobile has tall, arched windows tpååed bnu sandstone decorations. The facade has ear-lesenes (i.e. small square and the central pavilions also have pilasters with highly decorated capitals and grooves at the ground floor level. The cornices are decorated with Vases and cartouches on the roofs.

== Gallery ==
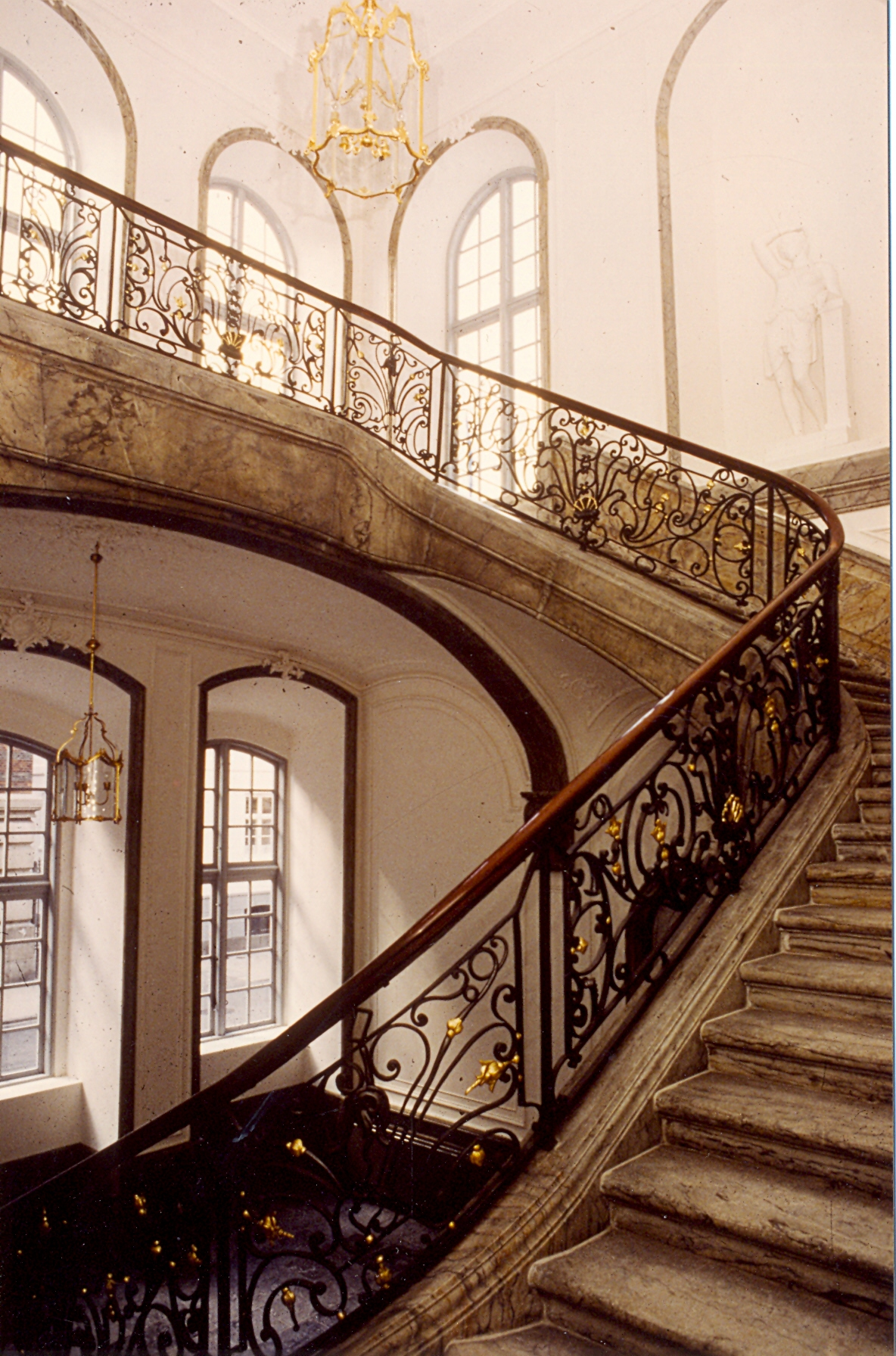
Interior

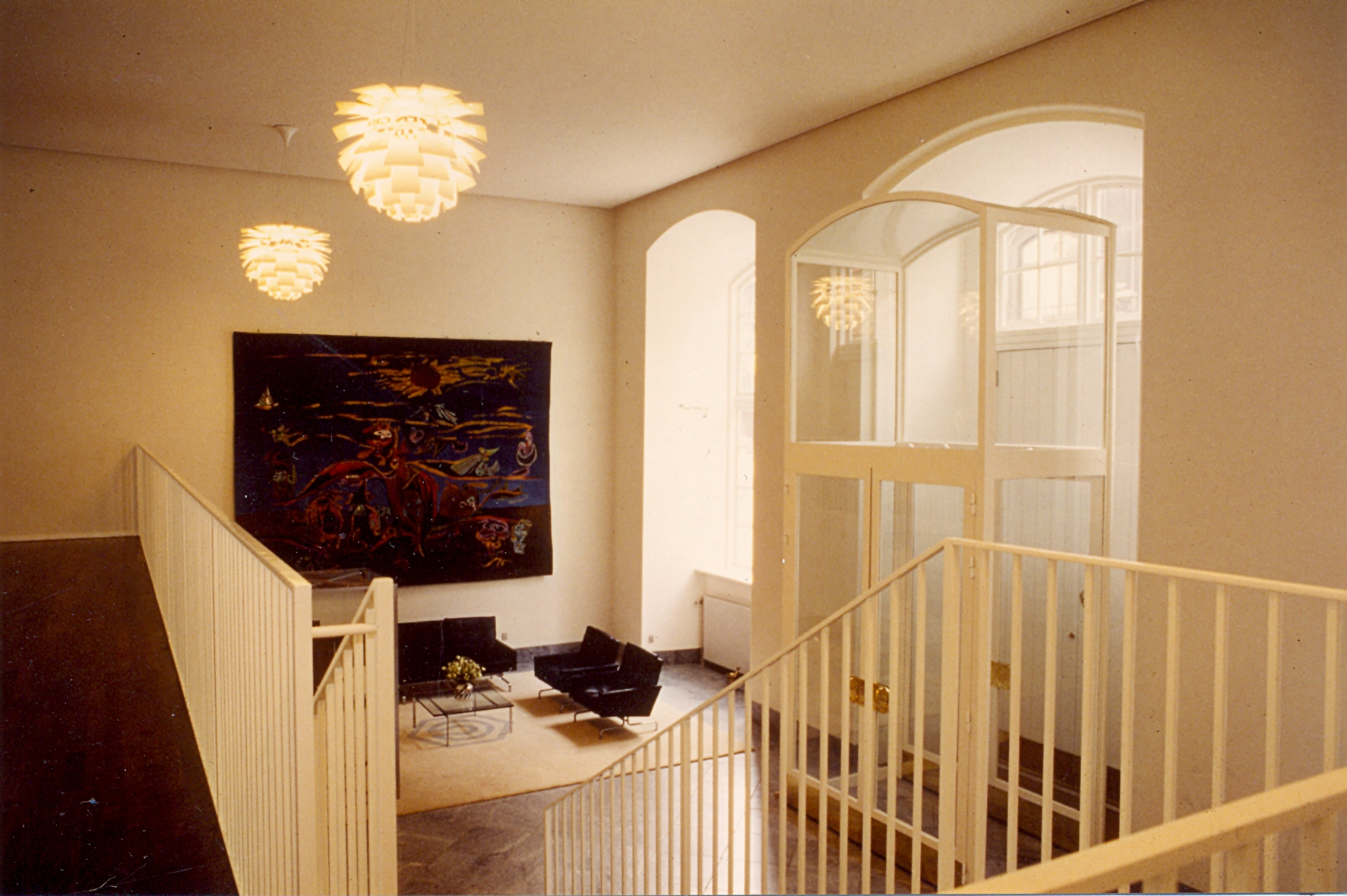
Interior

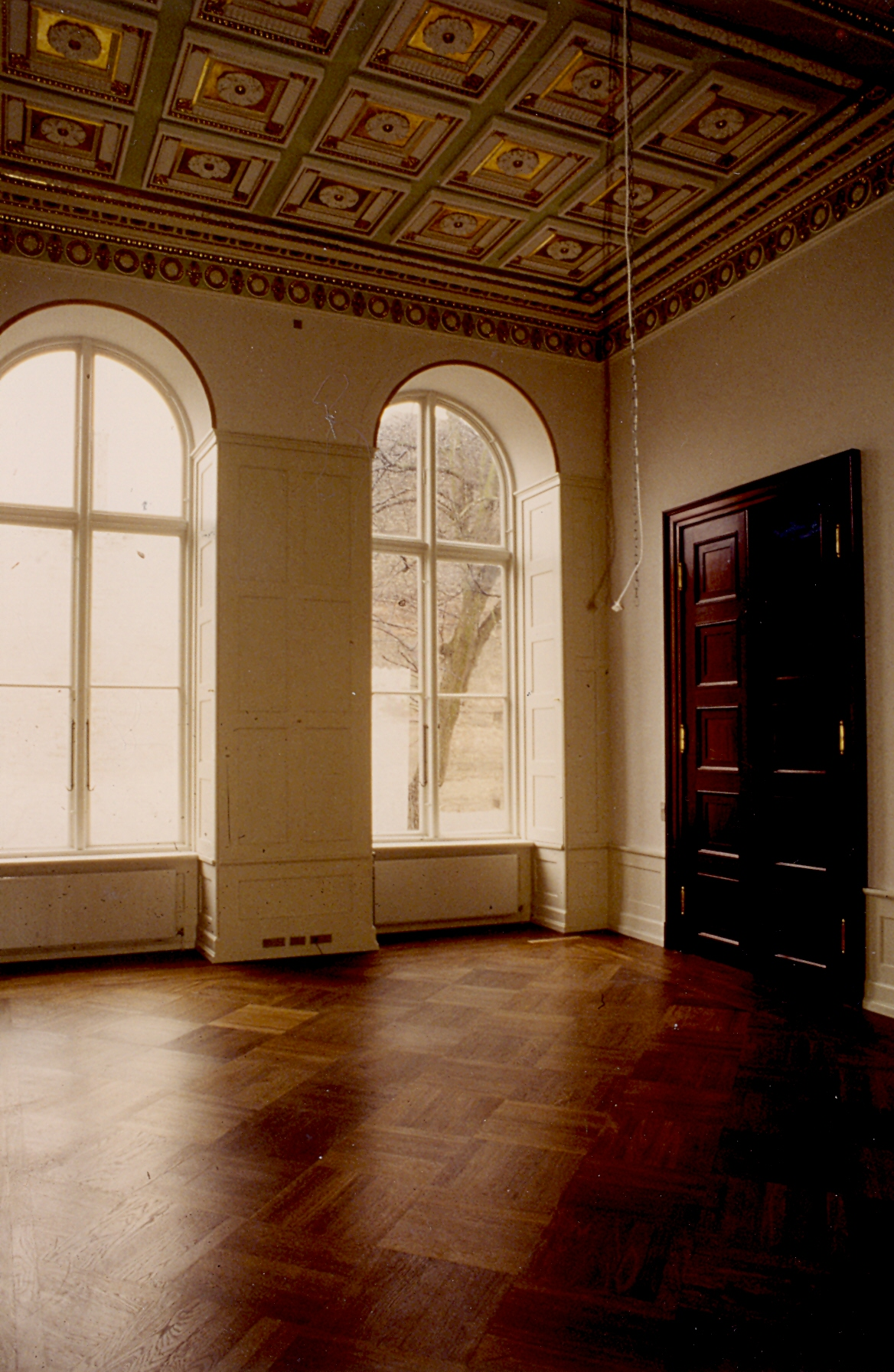
Interior
