= Lars Thylander =

Danish businessman and property investor (born 1962)

Lars Thylander (born 11 August 1962) is a Danish businessman and property investor. Lars Thylander was named Property Developer of the Year in 2007 by Danish magazine Erhvervsejendomme.

Lars Thylander buys, sells, and manages property in Denmark and Germany through the Thylander Group. He entered the property business in 1983 and founded the company in 1986. Through the 1980s and 1990s the group bought and sold a number of notable buildings and property companies in Denmark. Among them were buildings in Strøget and Bredgade in Copenhagen, and controlling stock holdings in public companies Ejendomsselskabet Norden A/S and Det Københavnske Ejendomssocietet A/S.

Among Lars Thylander's projects is the restoration of the landmark Vandflyverhangaren in Holmen, in 2001. Dorte Mandrup-Poulsen's new version of the old building was nominated for the prestigious Mies van der Rohe Award.

In 2006 the Thylander Group headed a syndicate that bought and sold the famous Scala building in Copenhagen.

Since 2005, Lars Thylander has been active in the German property market through companies like EI Invest Berlin I A/S and Victoria Properties A/S, a public company that deals with investment and fund & asset management related to property in Berlin, Frankfurt and Hamburg.
