= Thylander Group =

The Thylander Group is a family owned group of companies founded 1986 in Copenhagen by Lars Thylander. The group consists of the three mother companies Thylander & Company A/S, Thylander Ejendomme and Kay Tee Holding Aps with subsidiaries in Denmark and Germany, where The Thylander Group buys, develops and sells property.

Lars Thylander was named Property Developer of the year in 2007 by Danish magazine Erhvervsejendomme.

== Thylander Group history ==
Lars Thylander (born 11 August 1962) entered the property business in 1983 and founded The Thylander Group in 1986. Through the 1980s and 1990s the group bought and sold a number of outstanding buildings and property companies in Denmark. Among them were buildings in Strøget and Bredgade in Copenhagen, and controlling stock holdings in public companies Ejendomsselskabet Norden A/S and Det Københavnske Ejendomssocietet A/S.

Later the Thylander Group was involved in the prolific project of restoring the landmark Vandflyverhangaren in Holmen in 2001, and architect Dorte Mandrup-Poulsens new version of the old building was nominated for the prestigious Mies van der Rohe Award.

Since 2005 the Thylander Group has initiated the formation of EI Invest Berlin I A/S and brokered the purchase of 4.100 apartments in Berlin. The group later purchased an additional 200 flats in four more buildings in the German capitol.

In 2006 the Thylander Groups headed a syndicate that bought the historic Scala building in Copenhagen. The property was sold on later that year.

Also in 2006 the Thylander Group transformed the public company Torsana A/S into Victoria Properties A/S. The property company deals with investment and fund & asset management in regards to property in Berlin, Frankfurt and Hamburg.
