= Frederiksgade =

Street in Copenhagen, Denmark

Coordinates: 55°41′04″N 12°35′30″E

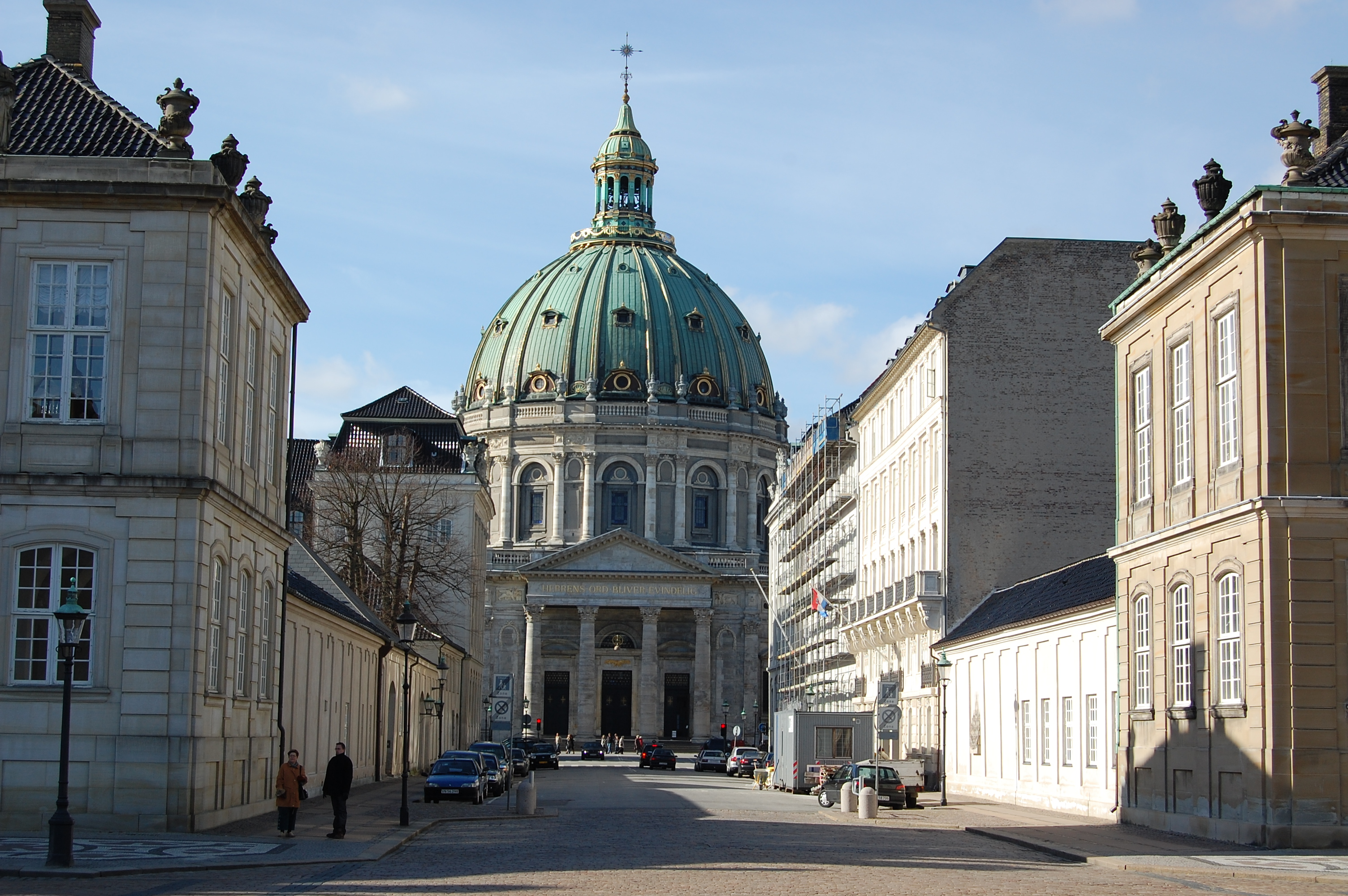
View along Frederiksgade towards the Marble Church

Frederiksgade is a street in the Frederiksstaden neighbourhood of central Copenhagen. It runs east from Store Kongensgade to Toldbodgade on the waterfront, passing the Marble Church, Bredgade and Amaliegade on the way. At the Marble Church the street splits and curves around both sides of the church before rejoining on its other side.

== Amalienborg axis ==
The section from the Marble Church to the waterfront makes up the so-called Amalienborg axis, the shorther but more prominent of the two axes on which the Frederiksstaden district is centred. At the central plaza of Amalienborg Palace, Frederiksgade intersects Amaliegade, the other, longer axis of the district. Jacques Saly's equestrian statue of Frederick V, in the centre of the plaza, is located directly on the intersection of the intersection of the two axes and looks towards the dome of the Marble Church.

In modern times, the Amalienborg Axis has been extended and reinterpreted. In 1983 the small Amalie Garden was inaugurated on a site between Amalienborg Palace and the water. Its large central fountain sits directly on the axis. With construction of the Copenhagen Opera House between 2001 and 2004 on the island of Holmen the axis has been extended across the harbour. Both projects have been conceived and financed by the A.P. Møller and Chastine McKinney Møller Foundation and have caused considerable controversy.
