= Bredgade =

Street in Copenhagen, Denmark

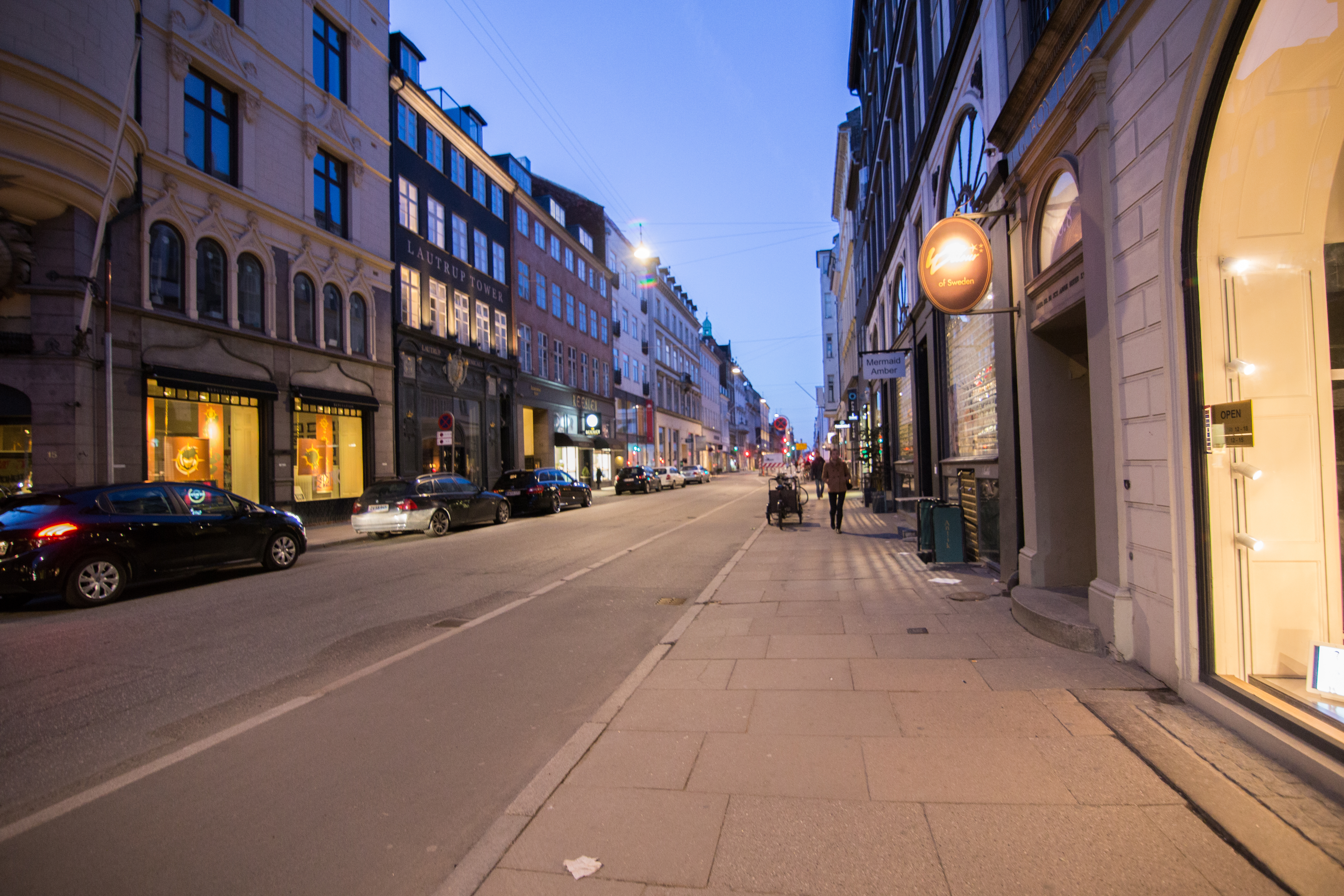
- Bredgade
- Length: 825 m (2,707 ft)
- Location: Indre By, Copenhagen, Denmark
- Postal code: 1260, 1263
- Coordinates: 55°41′6.72″N 12°35′18.6″E

Bredgade (lit. "Broad Street") is one of the most prominent streets in Copenhagen, Denmark. Running in a straight line from Kongens Nytorv for just under one kilometre to the intersection of Esplanaden and Grønningen, it is one of the major streets in Frederiksstaden, a Rococo district laid out in the middle of the 18th century to commemorate the tercentenary of the House of Oldenburg's accession to the Danish throne. It is lined with a number of fine mansions as well as other historic buildings. Many law firms, trade unions, fashion stores and art galleries are based in the street. The street also runs parallel to the Royal residence Amalienborg and Frederik's Church

== History ==
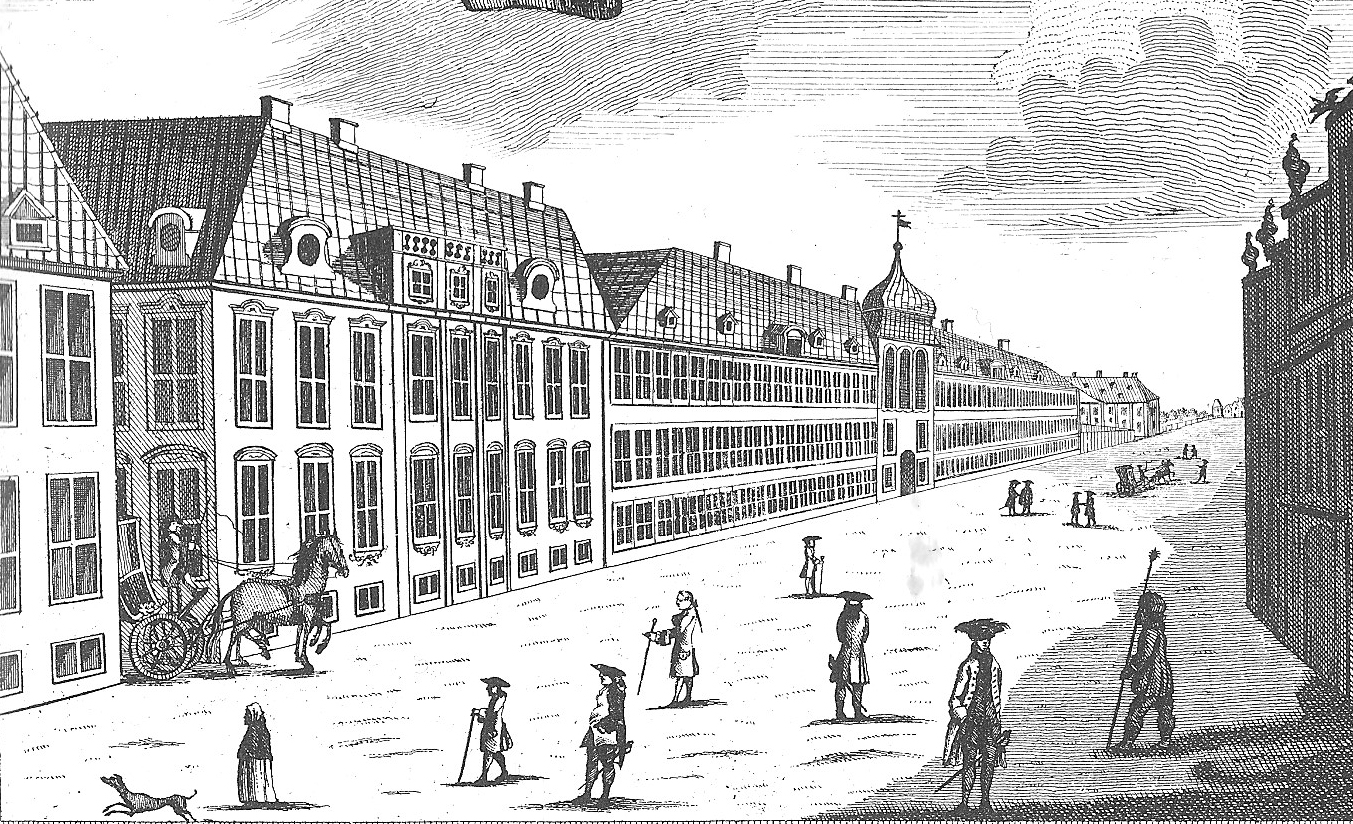
Norgesgade with the Moltke Mansion

In medieval times, Bredgade was little more than a track used for driving cattle in and out of the city, but by the end of the 16th century it had developed into the broadest road outside the Eastern City Gate (which at the time was located where Strøget meets Kongens Nytorv today), a fact reflected in the street's name (Broad Street). The street was mainly lined by large gardens with small houses and pavilions.

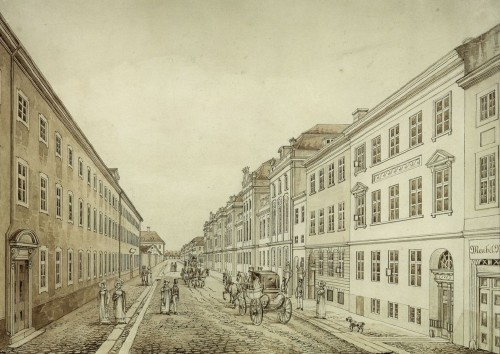
Bredgade at No. 38, looking north, watercolour by Heinrich Gustav Ferdinand Holm

When the course of the Eastern Rampart was changed over the first century, the whole area, now known as New Copenhagen, was incorporated into the fortified city. At that point Bredgade was renamed Norgesgade (English: Norway Street) to commemorate the King's possessions to the north and escape the rural connotations of the old name.

With the planning of Frederiksstaden around 1750, Bredgade saw a major building boom which included the construction of many fine mansions such as the Berckentinian Mansion, the Dehn Mansion and the Bernstorff Mansion. When Esplanaden was laid out at its far end in the 1780s, Bredgade's position as one of the most prominent streets of the city was consolidated even further.

The name Norgesgade never gained popularity and in 1877 the street's official name was finally changed back to Bredgade.

== Notable buildings and features ==
- Sankt Annæ Plads with the Garrison Church
- Moltke's Mansion
- Dehn Mansion
- Amalienborg axus with views along Frederiksgade to the Marble Church on one side and Amalienborg Palace to the other
- Bernstorff Mansion
- Eastern High Court
- Alexander Nevsky Church
- Odd Fellow Mansion
- St. Ansgar's Cathedral
- Frederik's Hospital, now the Danish Museum of Art & Design

== Gallery ==
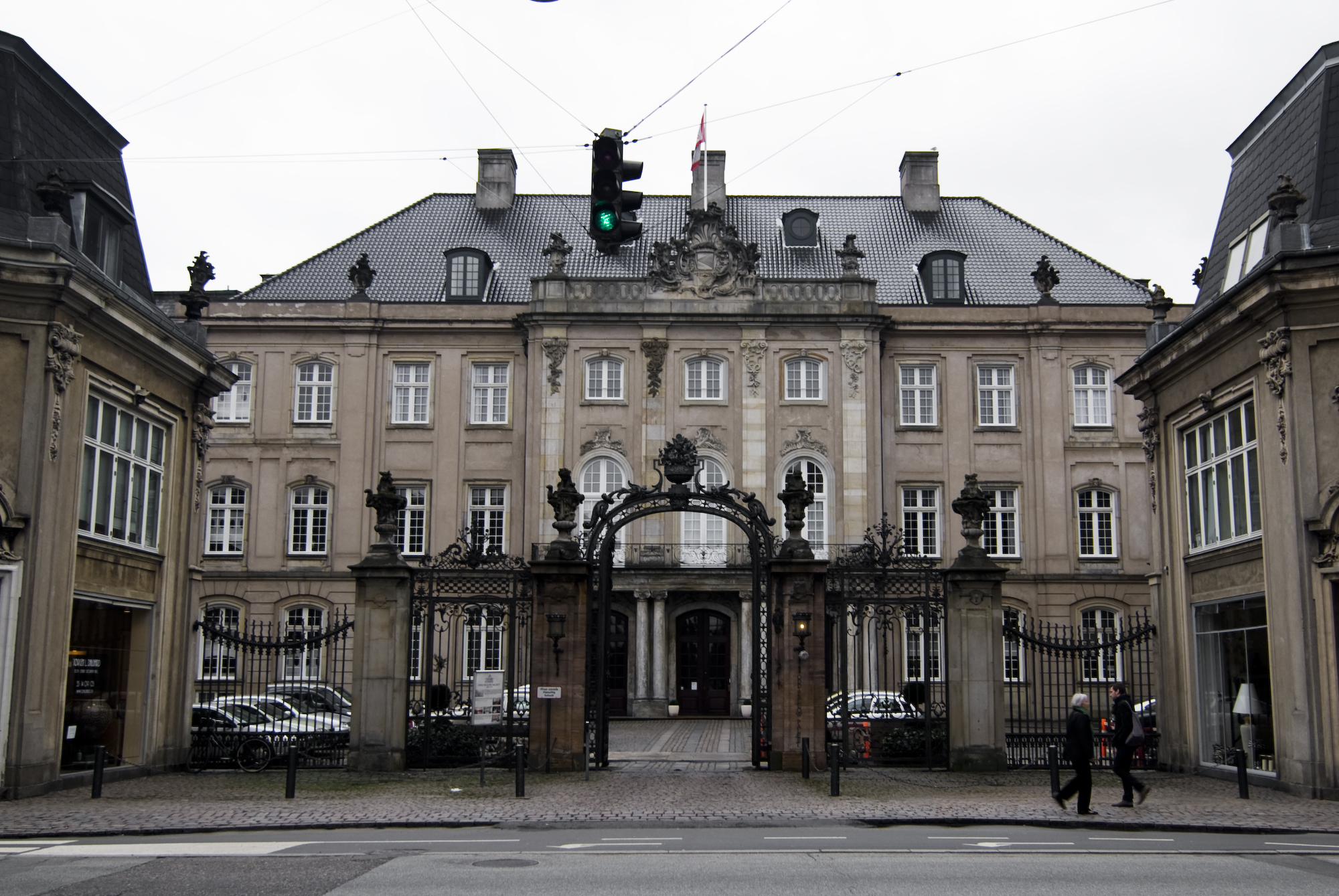
Odd Fellows Mansion (1755)

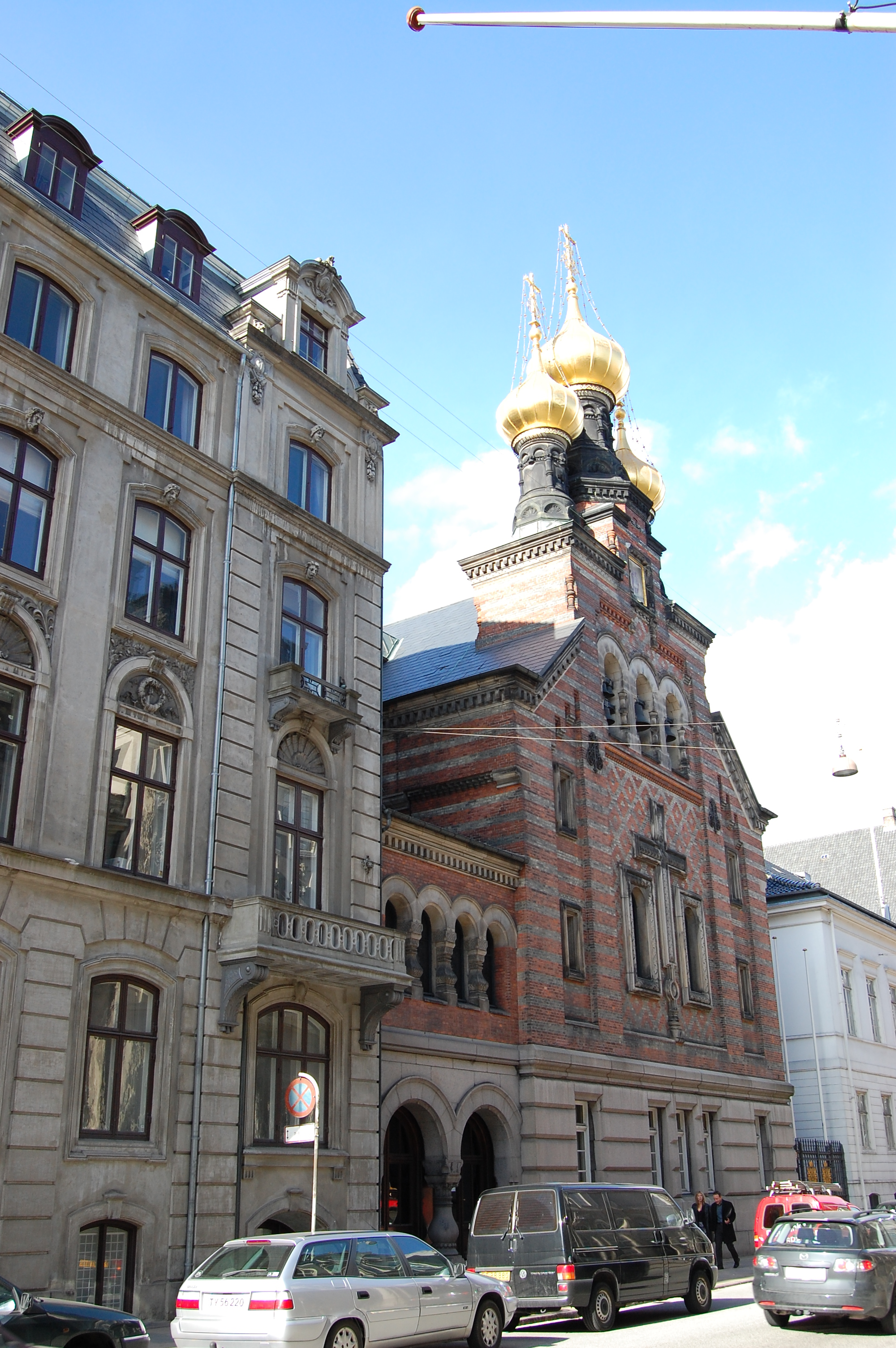
Alexander Nevsky Church (1883)

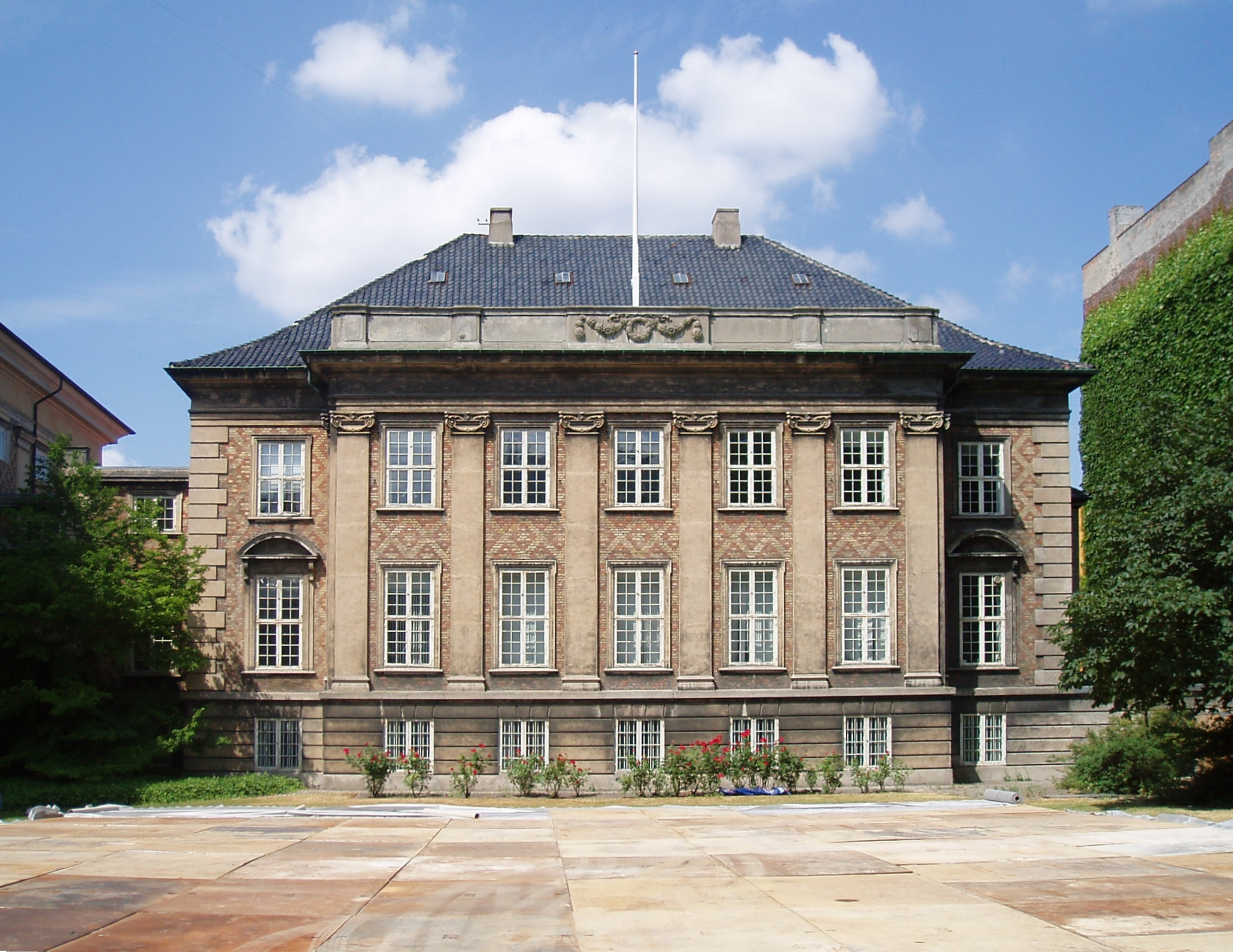
Eastern High Court (1702)

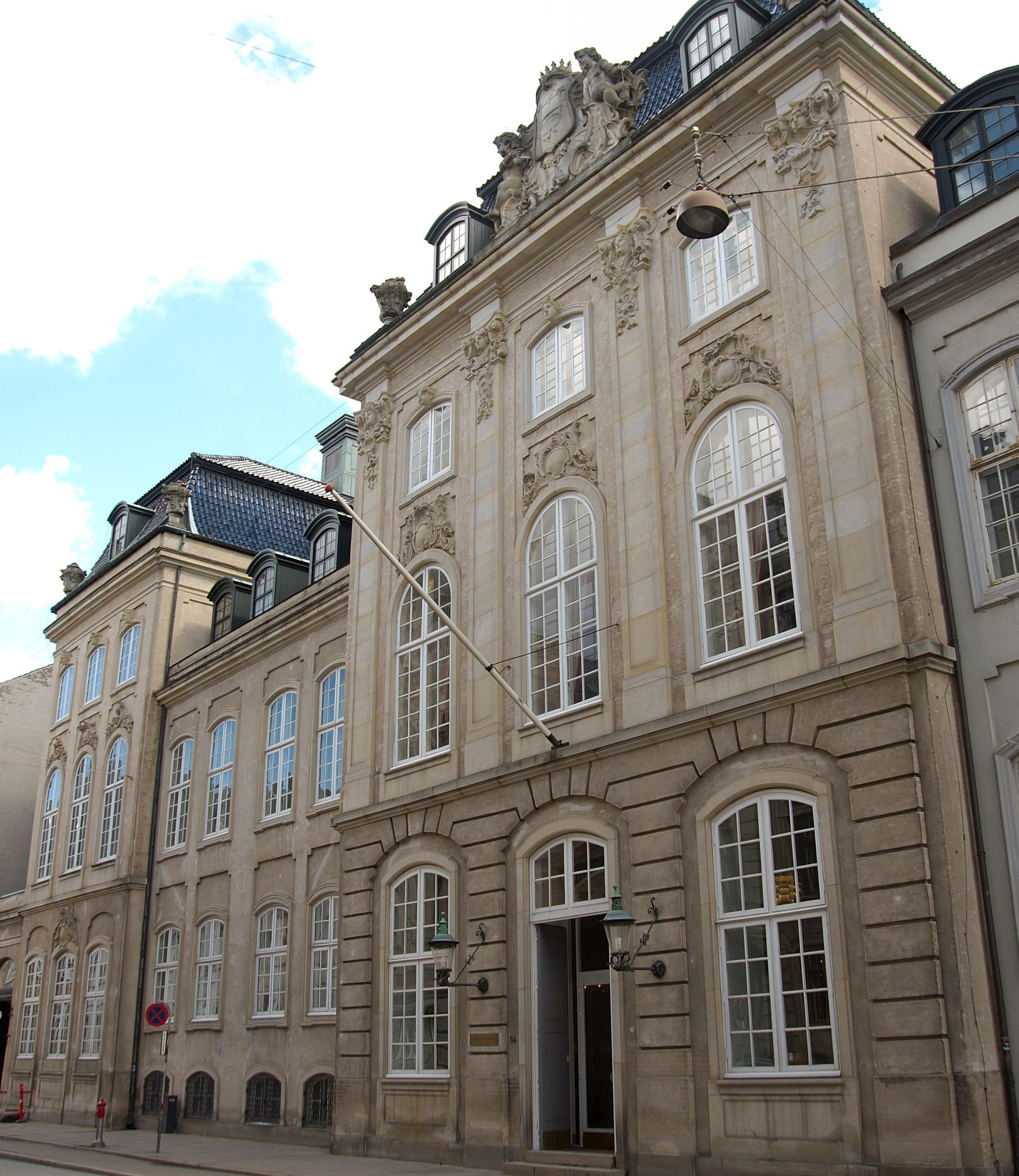
Dehn Mansion (1756)

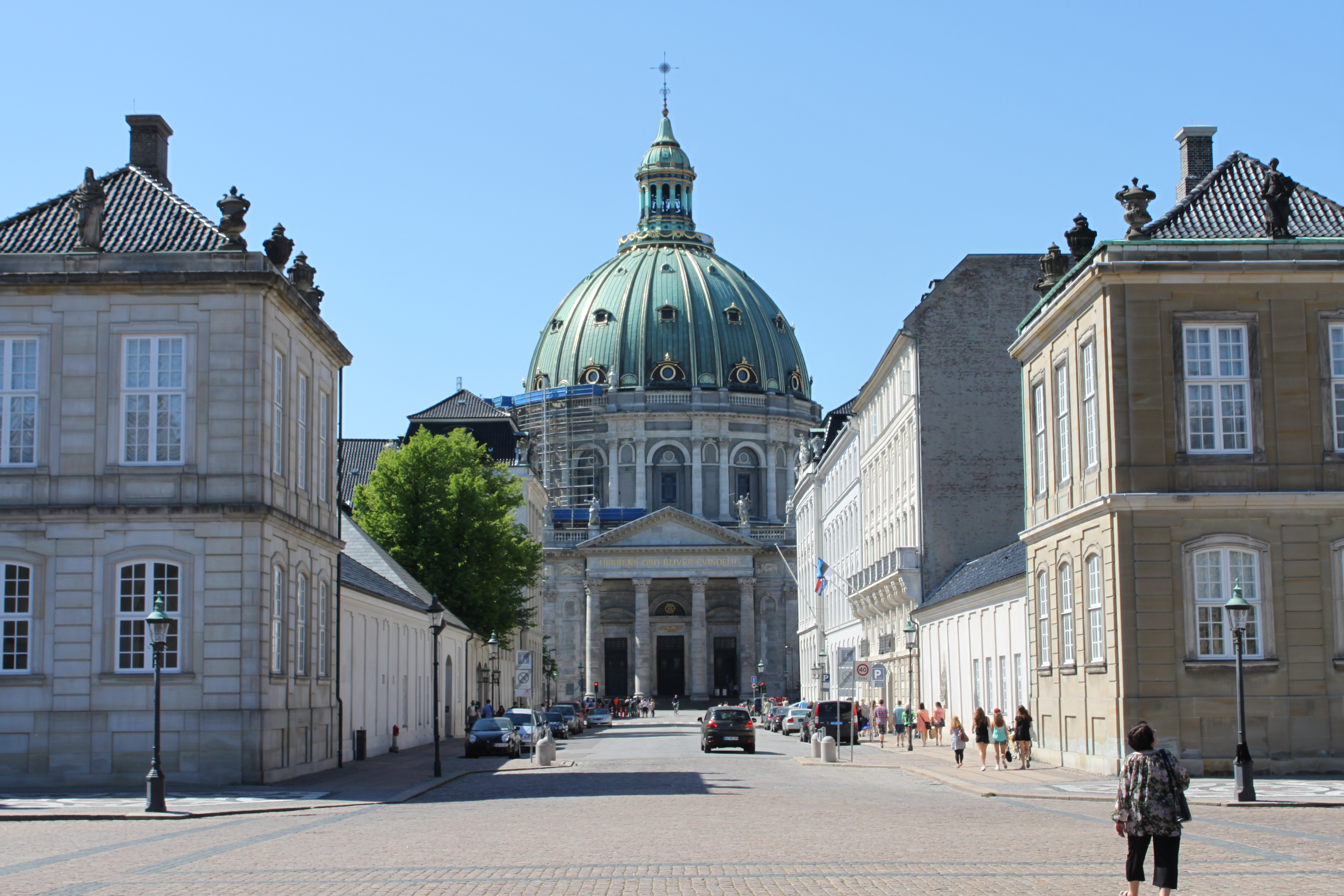
The Marble Church seen from Bredgade along Frederiksgade

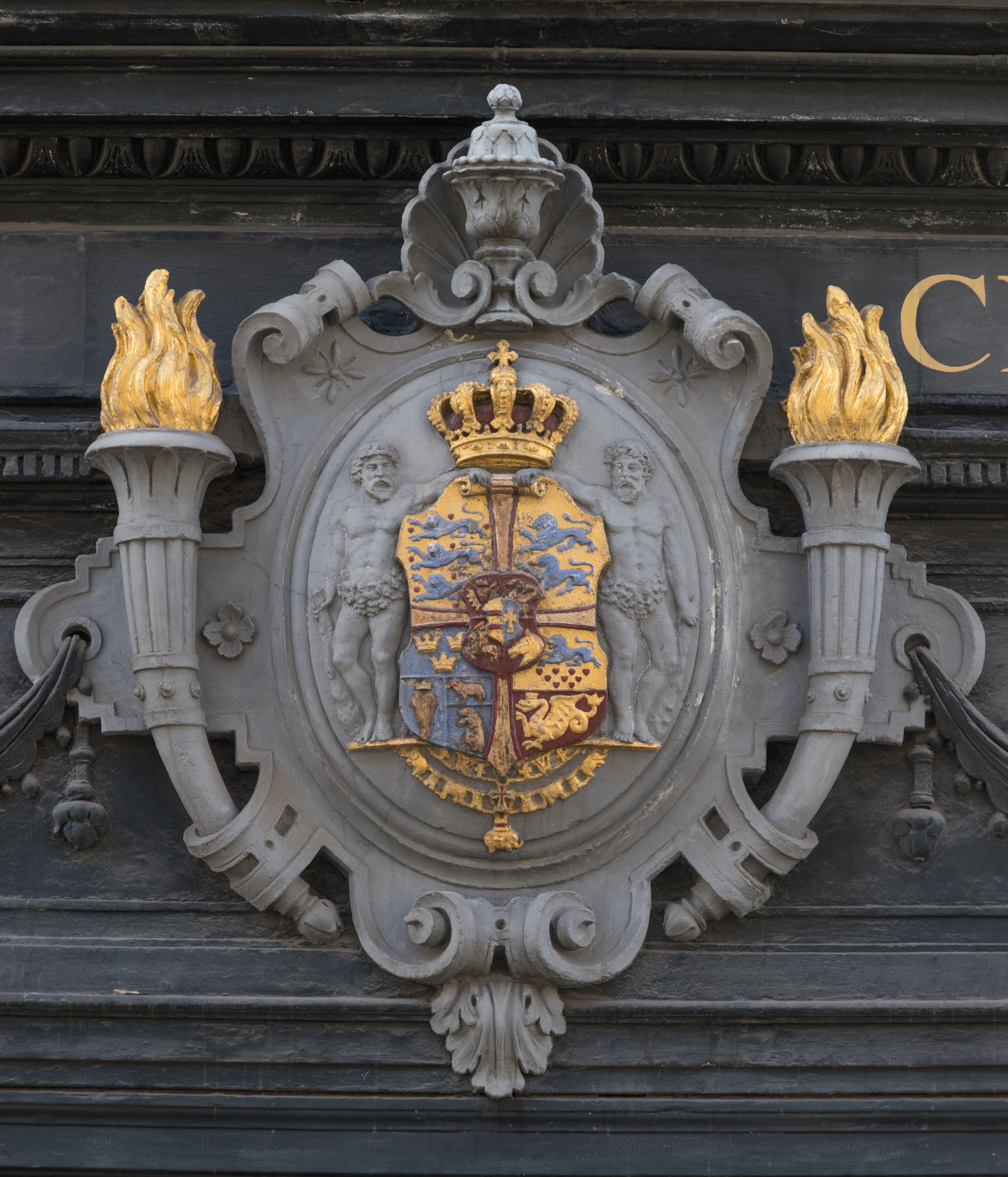
Ancient Danish coats of arms at a shop in Bredgade

== See also ==
- Budtz Müller
- Hassel & Teudt
