= Hassel & Teudt =

Hassel & Teudt was a Danish machine factory and manufacturer of metal goods based at Bredgade 43 in Copenhagen, Denmark.

== History ==
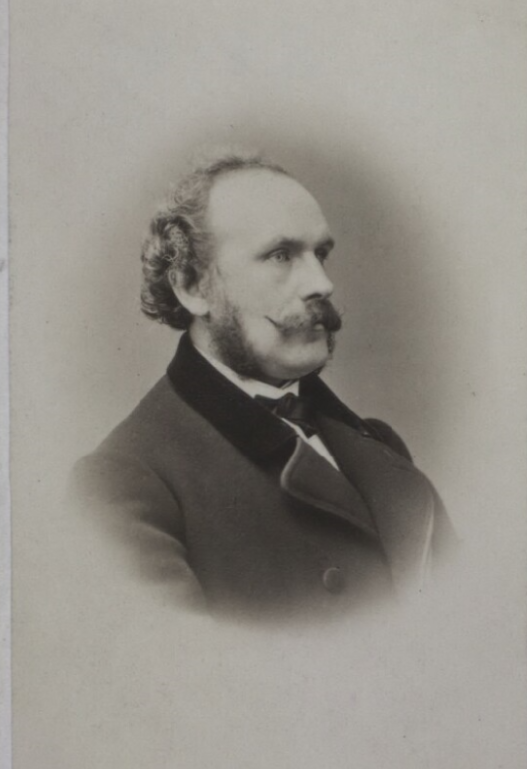
Johan Fridolin Hassel

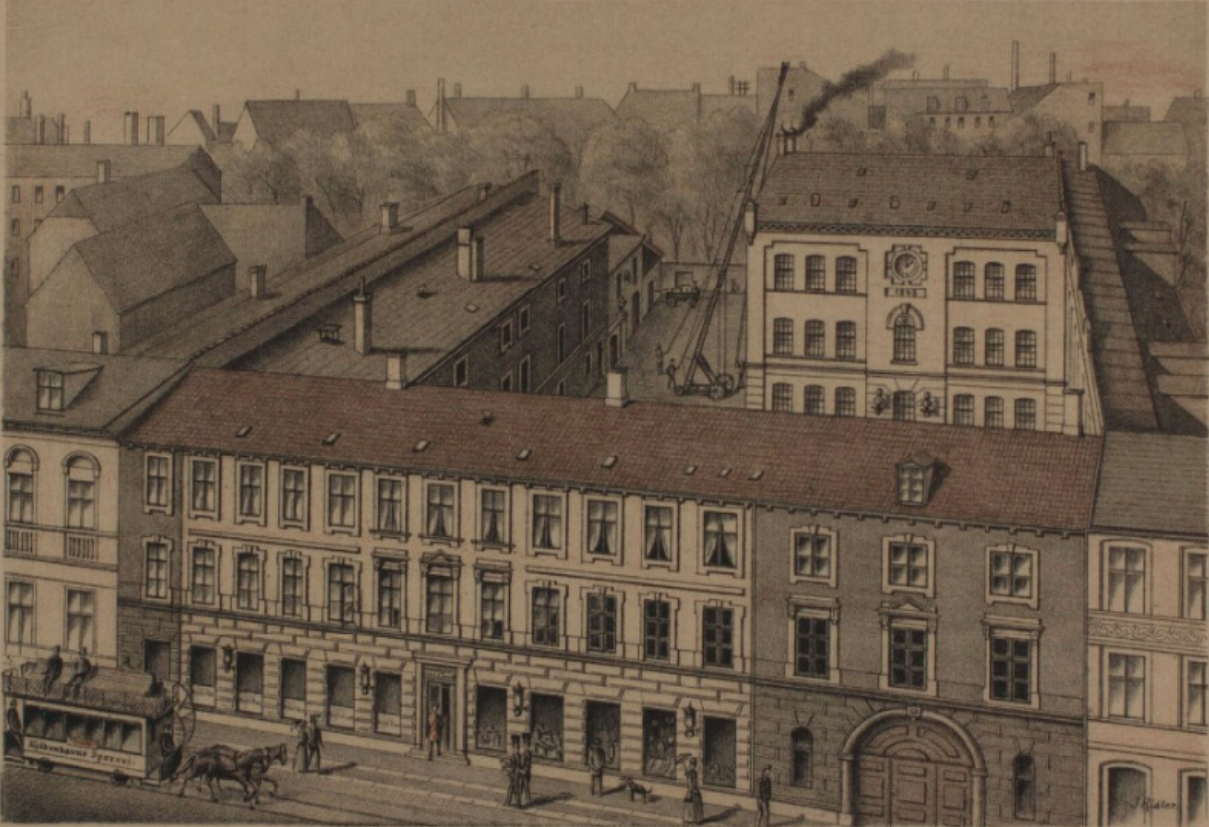
The company's building in Bredgade in Copenhagen

The company was founded on 30 June 1857 by J. G. Fridolin Hassel (1829-1887) and Ludvig F. Teudt (1820-1895). Teudt was originally from Mecklenburg but had come to Denmark in 1841. Hassel became the sole owner of the company when Teudt retired in 1883. The company was based at Bredgade 43. It was granted the predicate Purveyor to the Court of Denmark in 1886.

Hassel's widow, D. F. Hassel (born 1860), passed the company on to his brother Aage L. V. Hassel (1866-1923) ub 1898. His son, Aage Hassel (born 1894), took on the company after his father's death in 1823.

The company's buildings in Bredgade were replaced by a Modernist housing estate designed by Svenn Eske Kristensen in 1967–68.

== Products ==
Among the company's most well-known products today are the HT Rustik lamp series from the 1960s. It was produced with hand-moulded glass sconces in 12 different models.

Some of the original Copenhagen Benches from 1880 were manufactured by Hassel & Teudt. The rest were manufactured by Ludvigsen & Hermann at Nørrebrogade 39 in Nørrebro.
