= Frederik's Church =

Coordinates: 55°41′6″N 12°35′22″E

- Marmorkirken
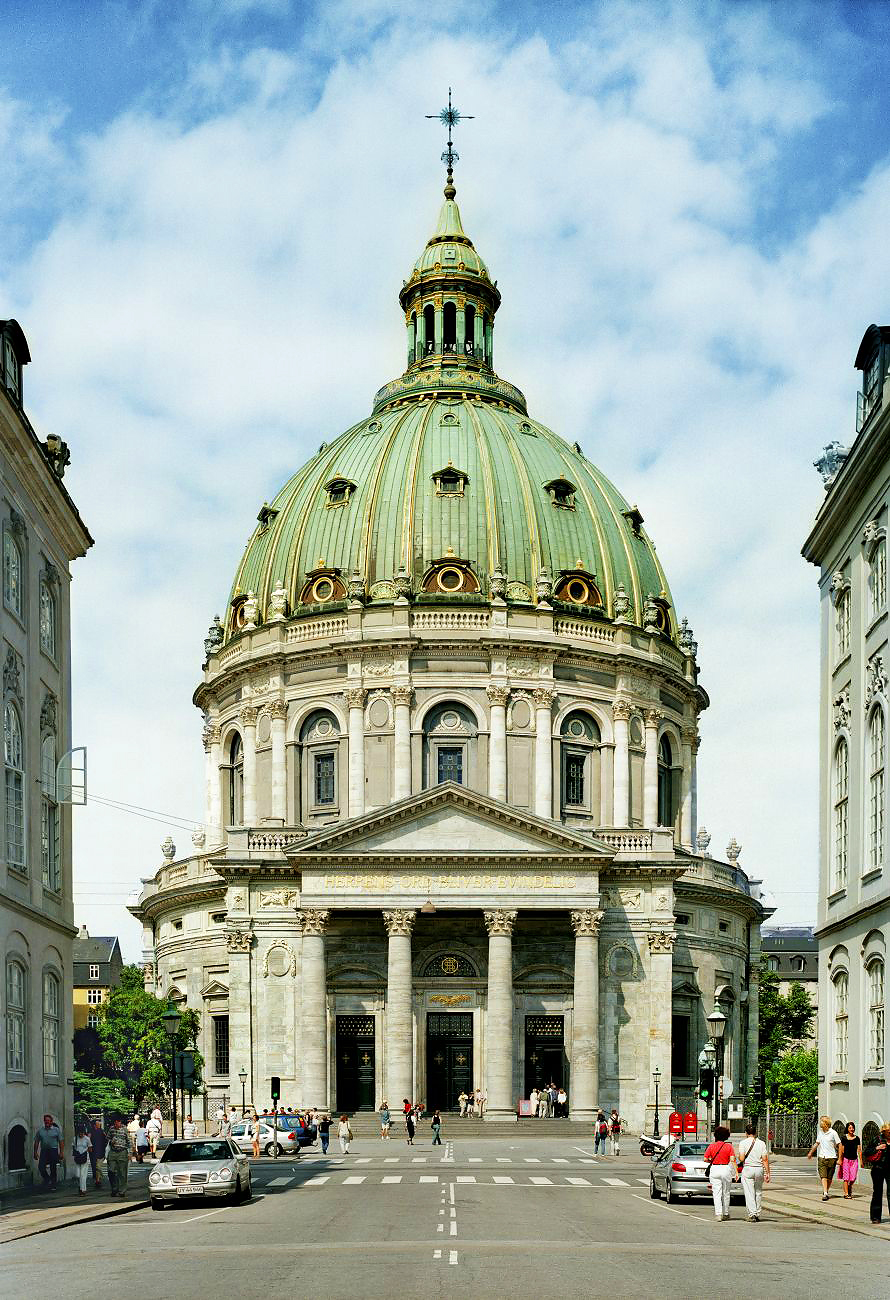
- Front entrance of the church
- Frederik's Church
- Location: Frederiksstaden, Copenhagen
- Country: Denmark
- Denomination: Church of Denmark
- Website: marmorkirken.dk

Architecture
- Architect(s): Nicolai Eigtved; Nicolas-Henri Jardin; Ferdinand Meldahl
- Style: Rococo
- Groundbreaking: 1749
- Completed: 1894

Administration
- Diocese: Copenhagen

Clergy
- Bishop: Peter Skov-Jakobsen

Frederik's Church (Danish: Frederiks Kirke), popularly known as The Marble Church (Marmorkirken) for its rococo architecture, is an Evangelical Lutheran church in Copenhagen, Denmark. The church forms the focal point of the Frederiksstaden district; it is located due west of Amalienborg Palace.

== History and description ==
The church was designed by the architect Nicolai Eigtved in 1740 and was, along with the rest of Frederiksstaden, a district of Copenhagen, intended to commemorate the 300-year jubilee of the first coronation of a member of the House of Oldenburg.

Frederick's Church has the largest church dome in Scandinavia with a span of 31 metres (102 ft). Eigtved finished the drawings of the church around 1740, but his original design was much more pompous; the dome should have been significantly taller and rest on the exterior walls with a diameter of 45 metres (148 ft). The dome rests on twelve columns. The dome is Roman Baroque style with its curved, pompous expression and multiple fine details. It has gold window frames, multiple statues on the exterior walls and a beautiful, colorful fresco inside the dome ceiling, which most likely is inspired by Peter's Basilica in Rome.

The foundation stone was set by King Frederick V on 31 October 1749, but the construction was slowed by budget cuts and the death of Eigtved in 1754. A French architect, Nicolas-Henri Jardin, continued the construction from 1756 after revising the design and changing it to a more classical, marble church.

In 1770, the original plans for the church were abandoned by Johann Friedrich Struensee. The church was left incomplete and, in spite of several initiatives to complete it, stood as a ruin for nearly 150 years.

A few years later, when Struenesee lost his power and position, several ideas were created and considered in trying to make a modified construction plan for the church. Among these intellectual minds was C. F. Hardsdorff, a Danish architect and advocate for neoclassicism.

In 1874, Andreas Frederik Krieger, Denmark's Finance Minister at the time, sold the ruins of the uncompleted church and the church square to Carl Frederik Tietgen for 100,000 rigsdaler — none of which was to be paid in cash — on the condition that Tietgen would build a church in a style similar to the original plans and donate it to the state when complete, while in turn he acquired the rights to subdivide neighboring plots for development.

Tietgen not only wanted the church to represent a folklore to The Royal House, but also as a great monument for the grundtvigianismen, created by Danish pastor and philosopher, N. F. S. Grundtvig. At the front entrance, a statue of Grundtvig was raised and the exterior walls around the church are also decorated with statues of important people from the Danish and international church history.

The deal was, at the time, highly controversial. On 25 January 1877, a case was brought by the Folketing at the Court of Impeachment (Danish: Rigsretten), Krieger being charged with corruption over this deal. He was, however, eventually acquitted.

Tietgen got Ferdinand Meldahl to design the church in its final form and financed its construction. Due to financial restrictions, the original plans for the church to be built almost entirely from marble were discarded, and instead Meldahl opted for construction to be done with limestone. The church was finally opened to the public on 19 August 1894.

Inscribed in gold lettering on the entablature of the front portico are the words: HERRENS ORD BLIVER EVINDELIG (Danish: the word of the Lord endureth for ever – 1 Peter 1:25, KJV).

A series of statues of prominent theologians and ecclesiastical figures, including one of the eminent Danish philosopher Kierkegaard (who, incidentally, had become very critical of the established church by the end of his life), encircles the grounds of the building.

Frederik's church is a parish church, also known to be an Evangelical–Lutheran church, which is the national or most common church in Denmark. It also became a place for concerts, monument of the constitution, and a display of sculptor Thorvaldsen's works of art. Many people in Denmark call it the Marble Church instead of Frederik's Church due to its prominent feature of the marble dome.

Today, Frederik's church stands as vast architectural monument in Frederiksstaden as a tribute to the roman baroque and Danish philosopher Grundtvig.

== Architecture and notable features ==
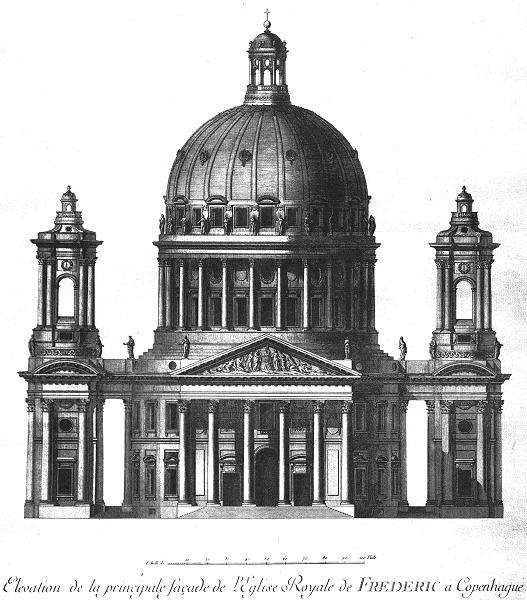
Jardin's original plan for the church

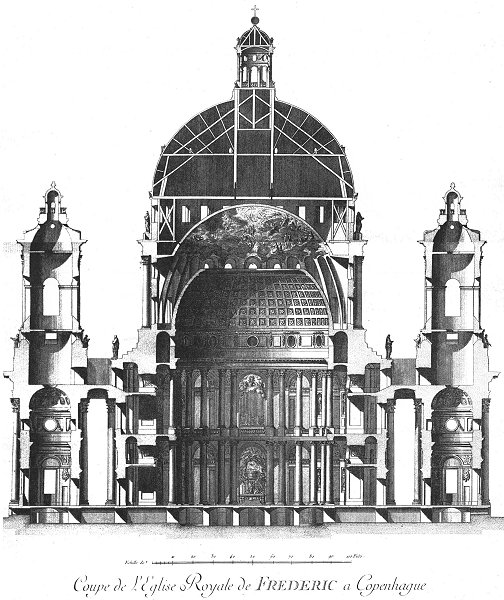
Cross-section of Jardin's church

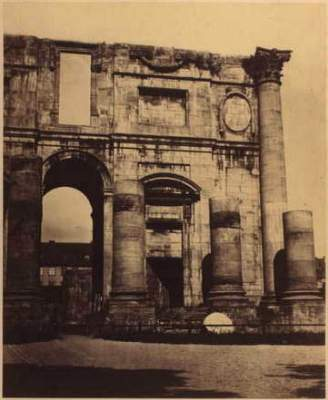
Ruins of the unfinished entrance ca. 1875

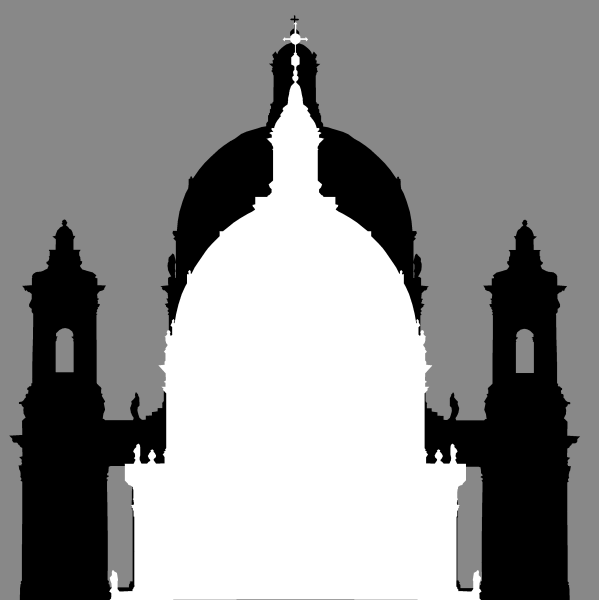
Comparison between Jardin's (black) and Meldahl's (white) "Frederik's Church"

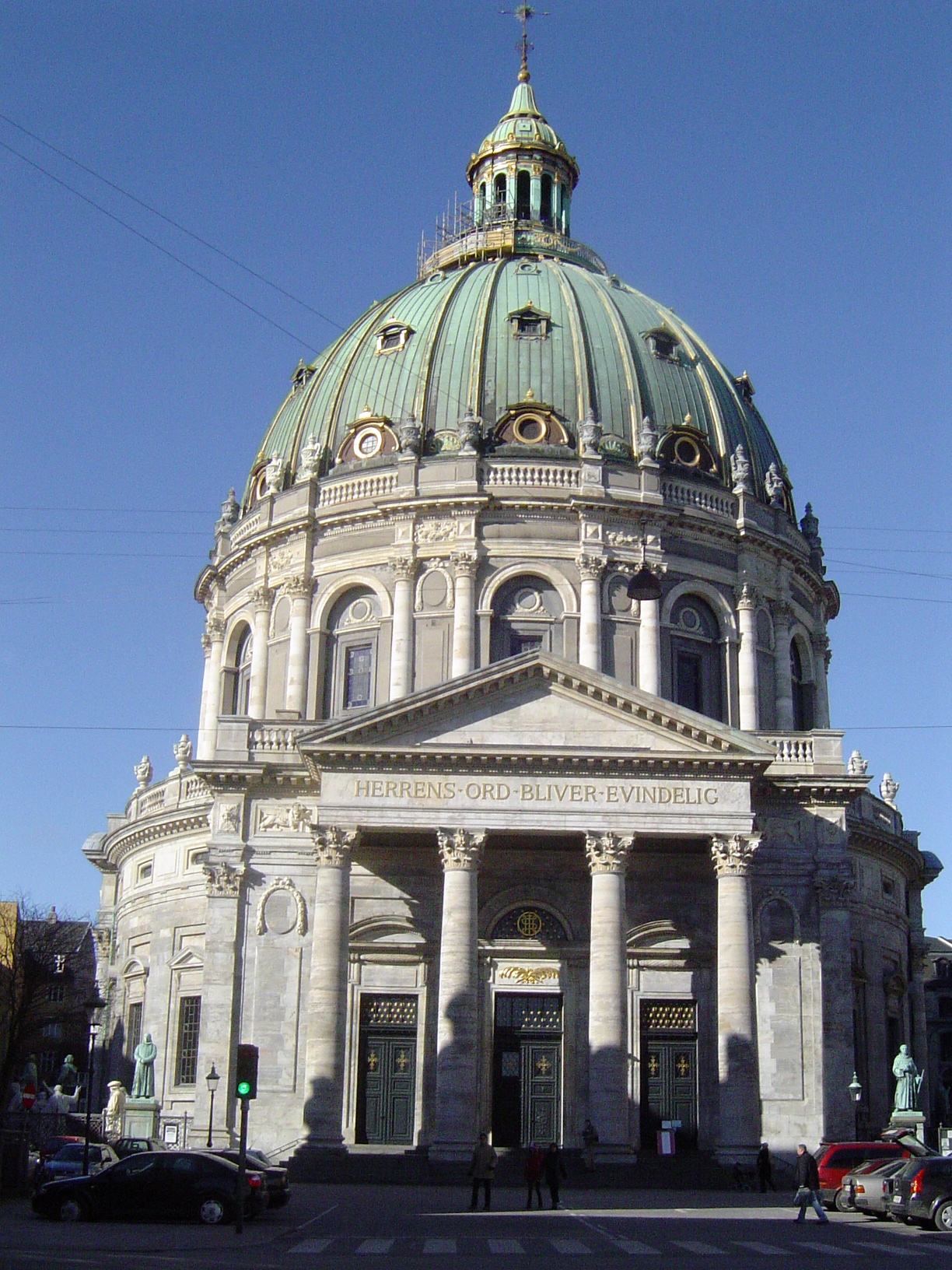
Front entrance

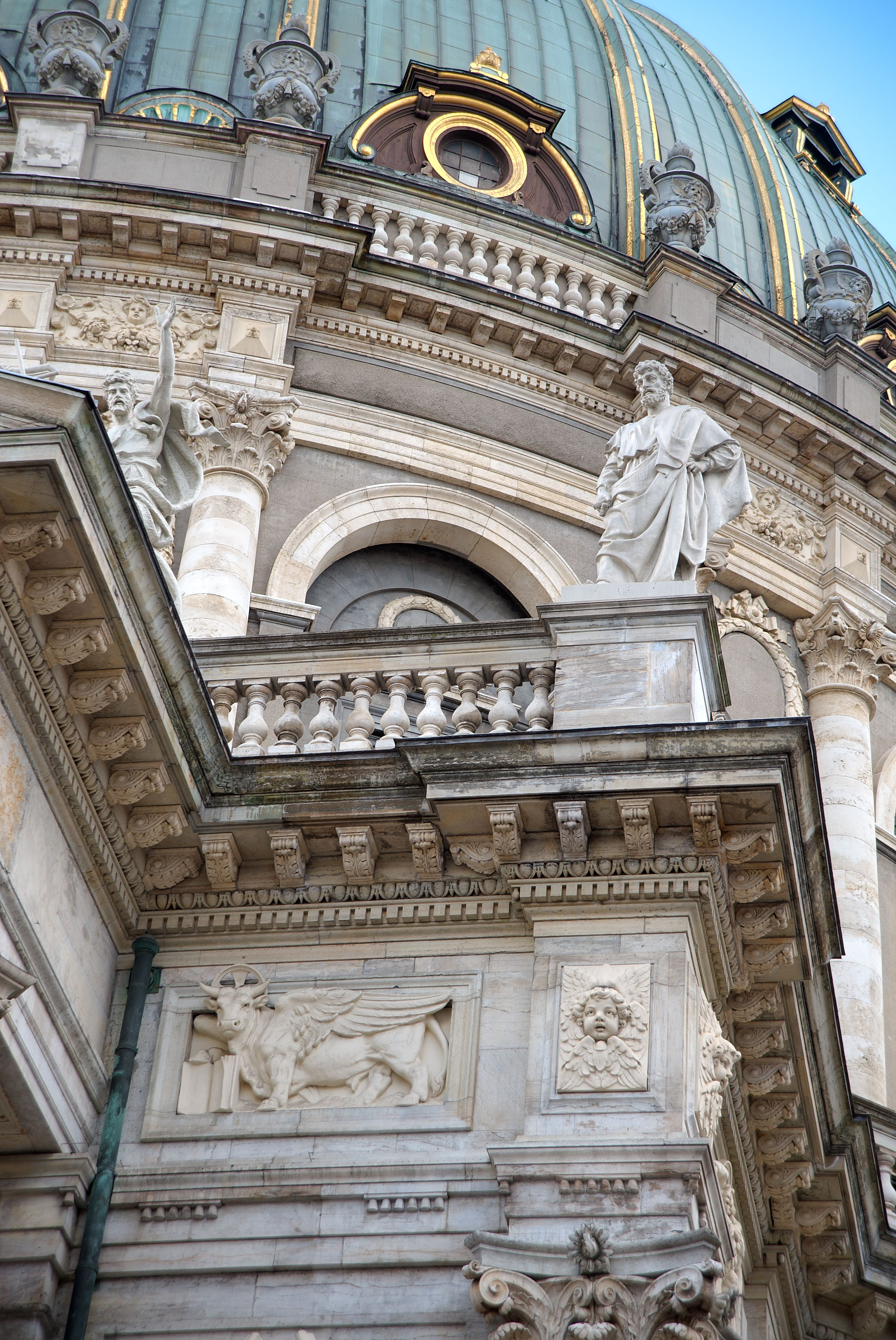
Exterior detail

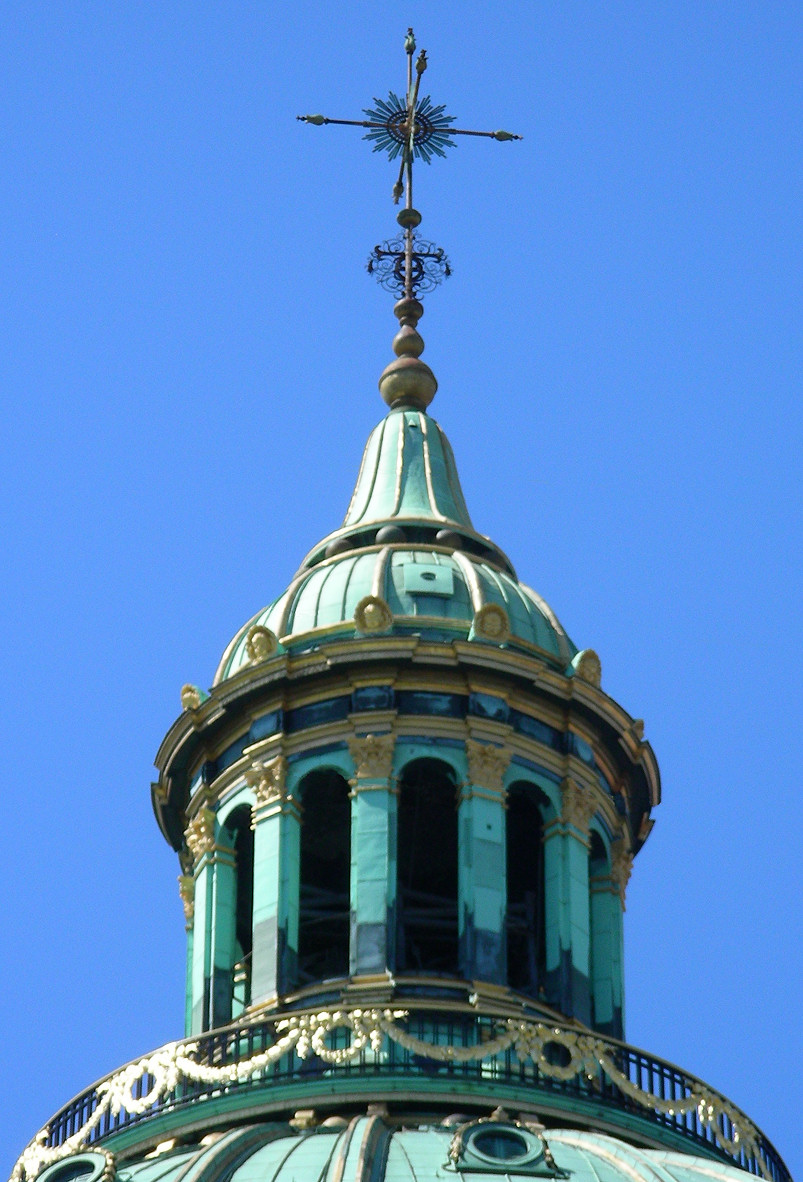
Dome lantern

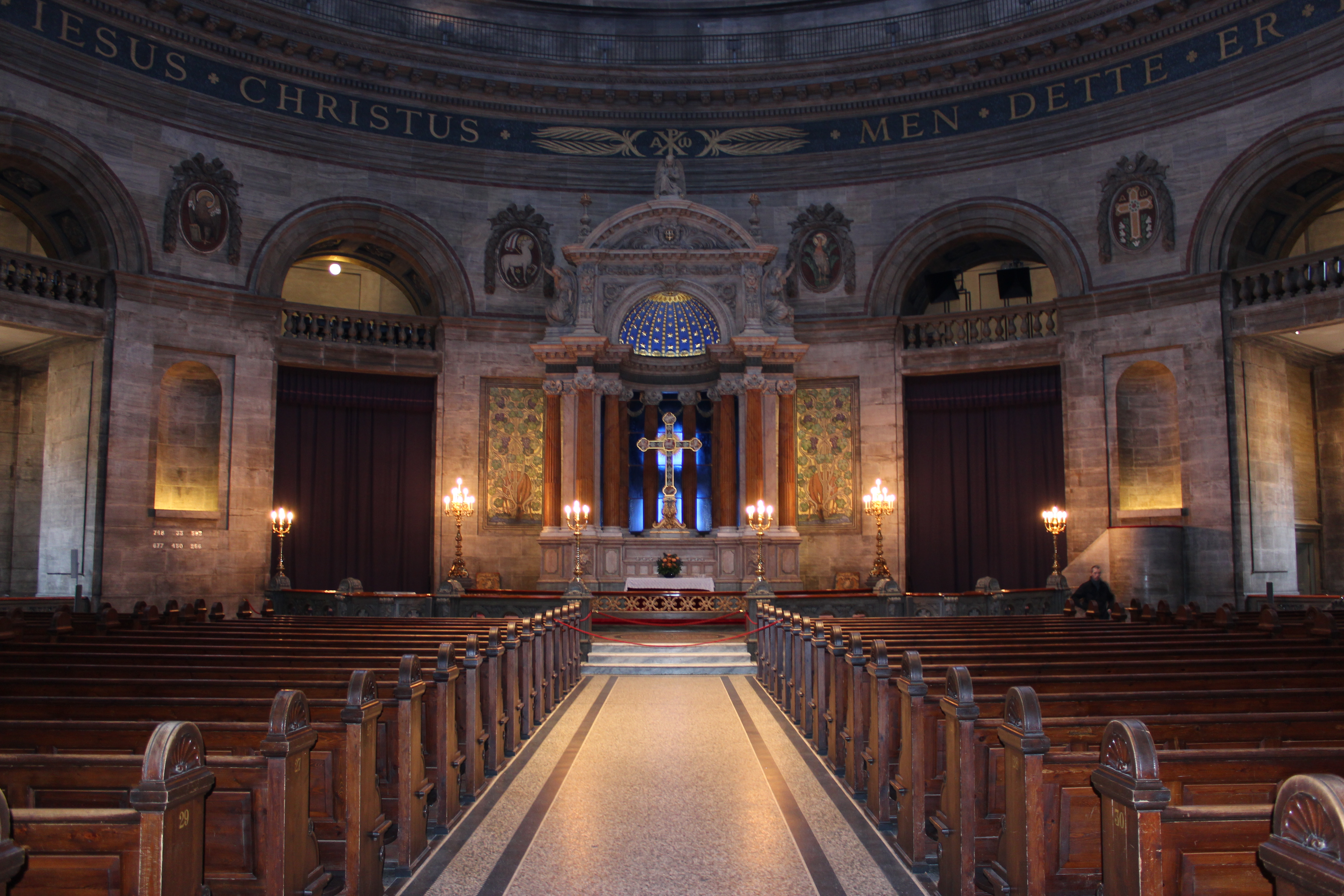
Interior

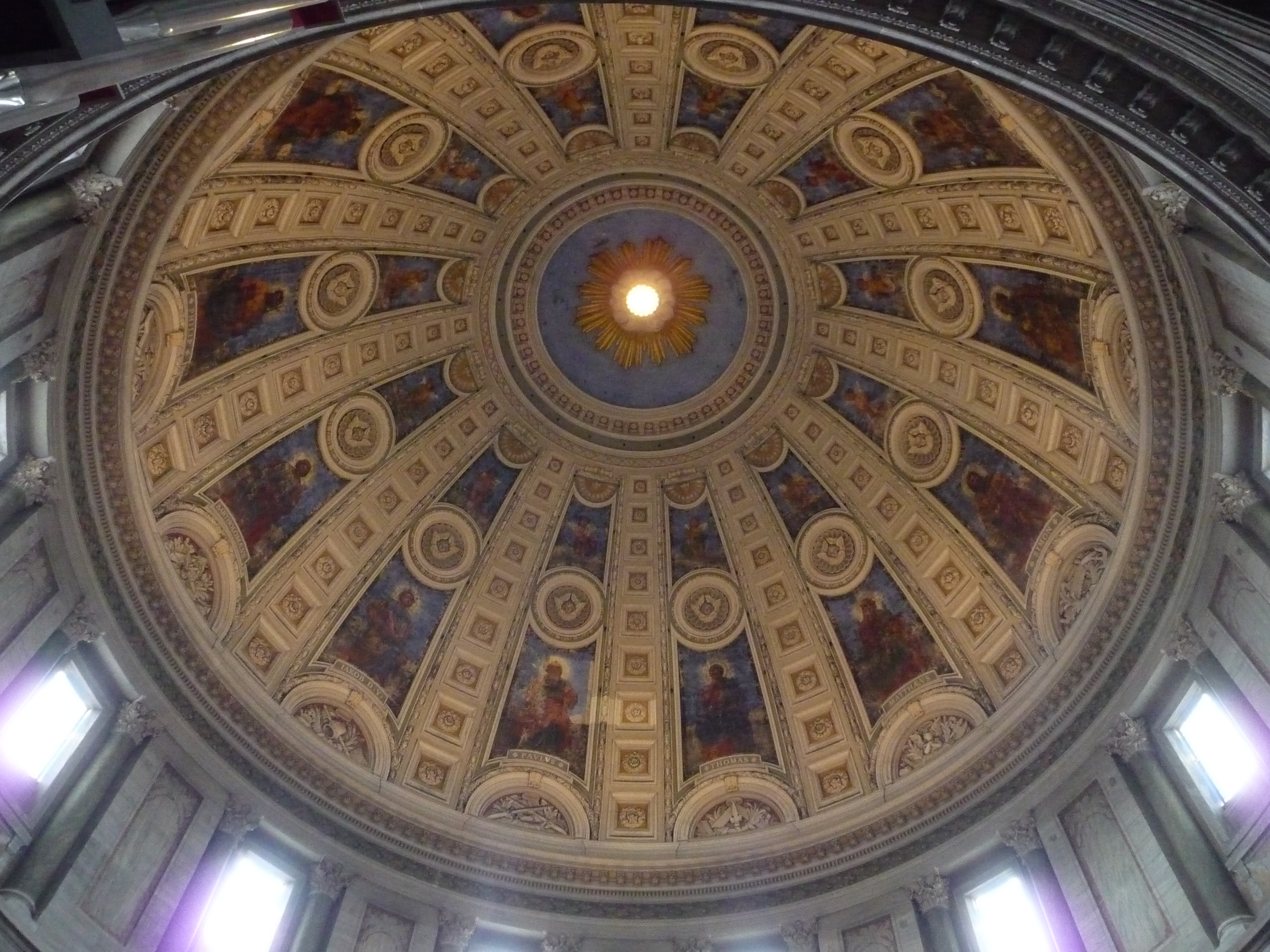
Dome interior

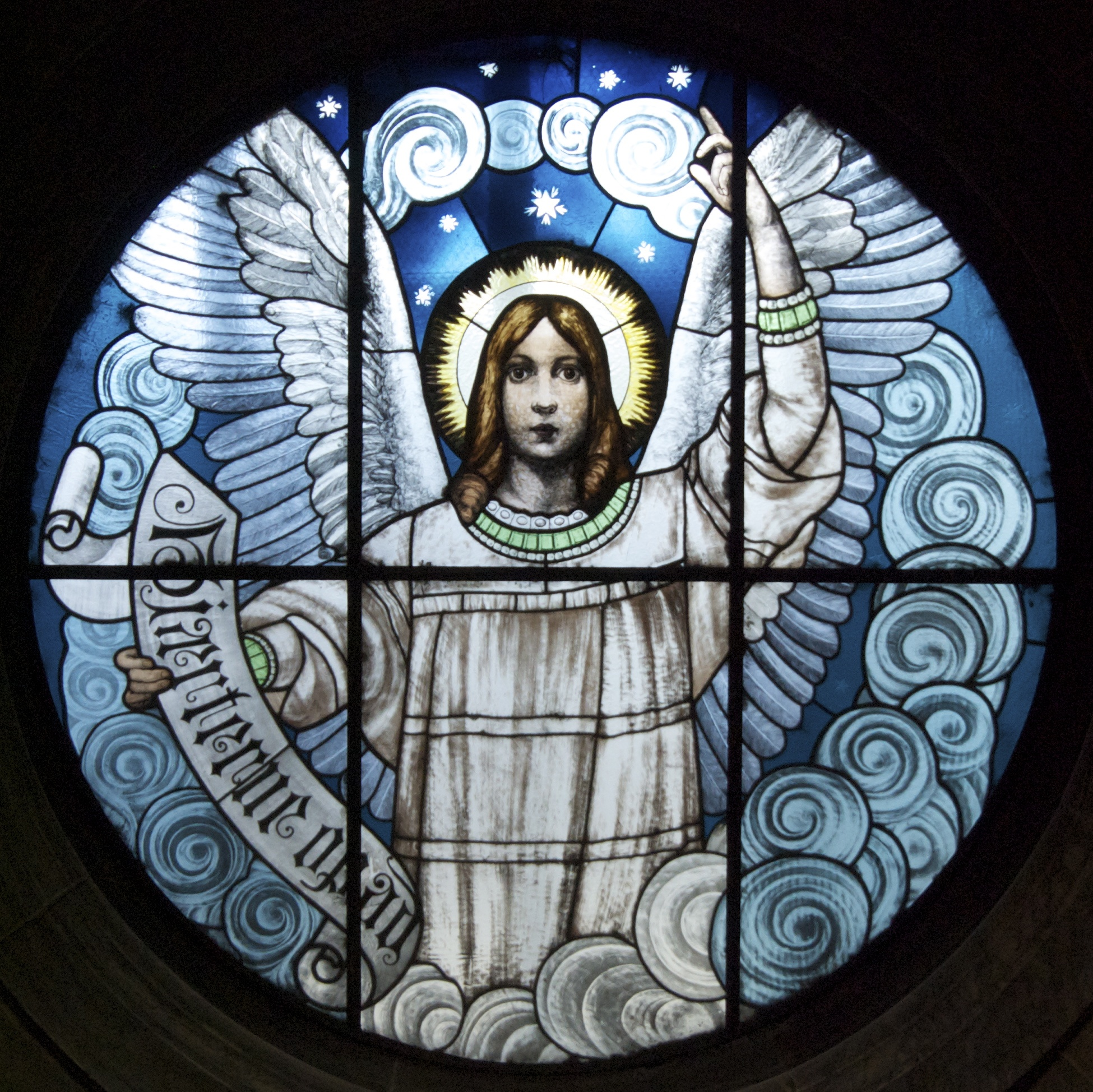
Stained glass window depicting an angel

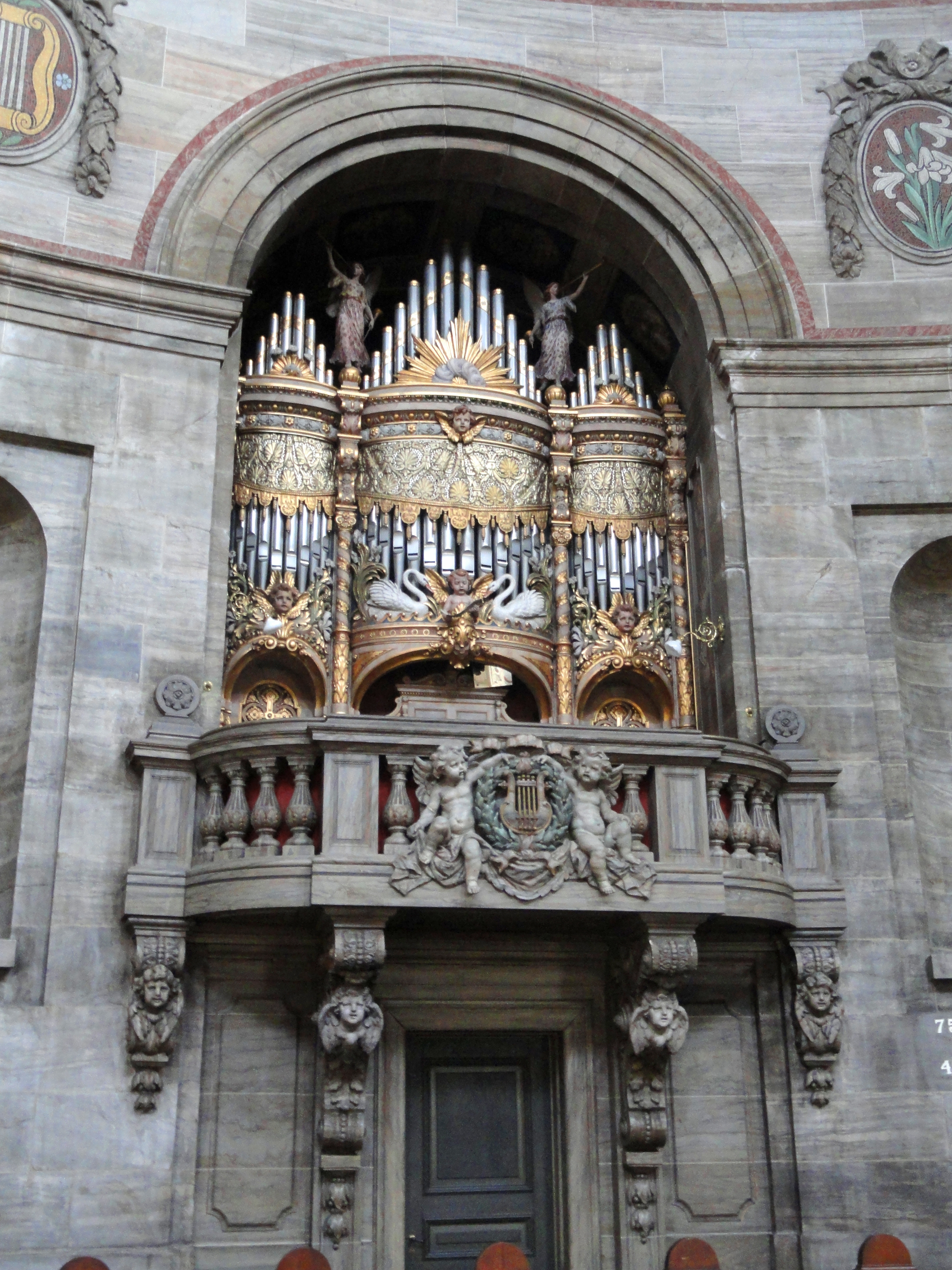
The organ loft

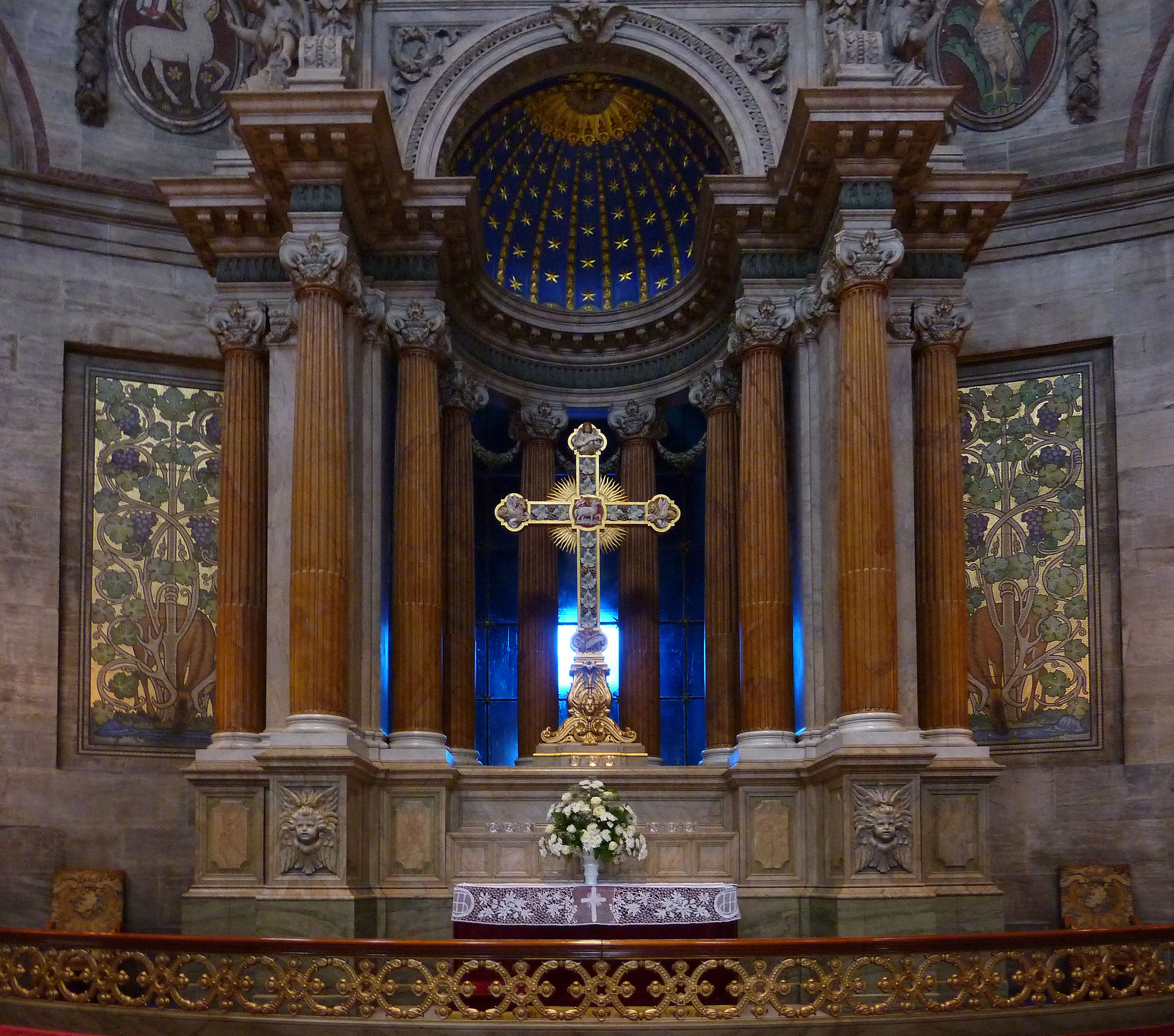
Altar

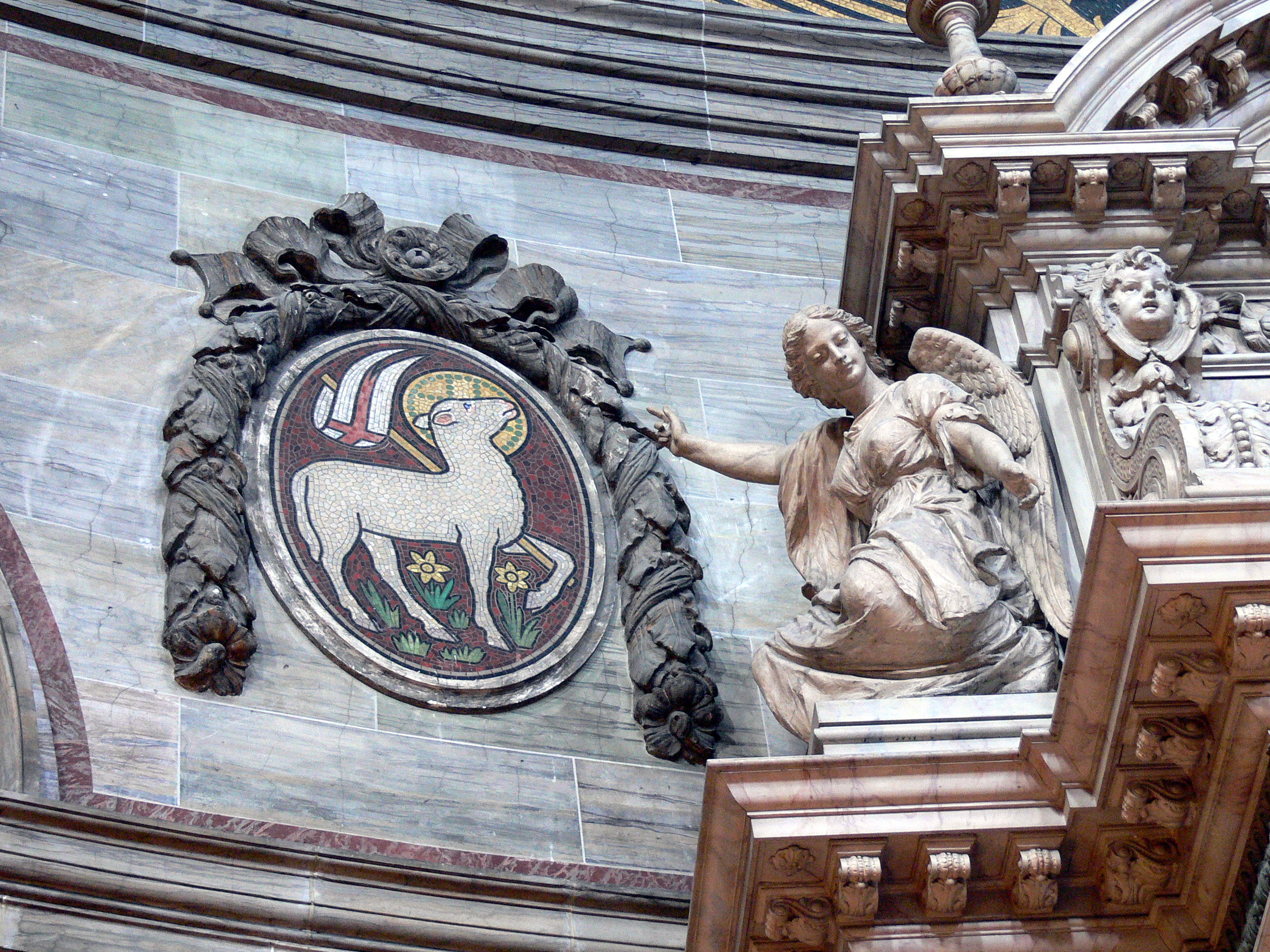
Angel pointing at Agnus Dei above the altar

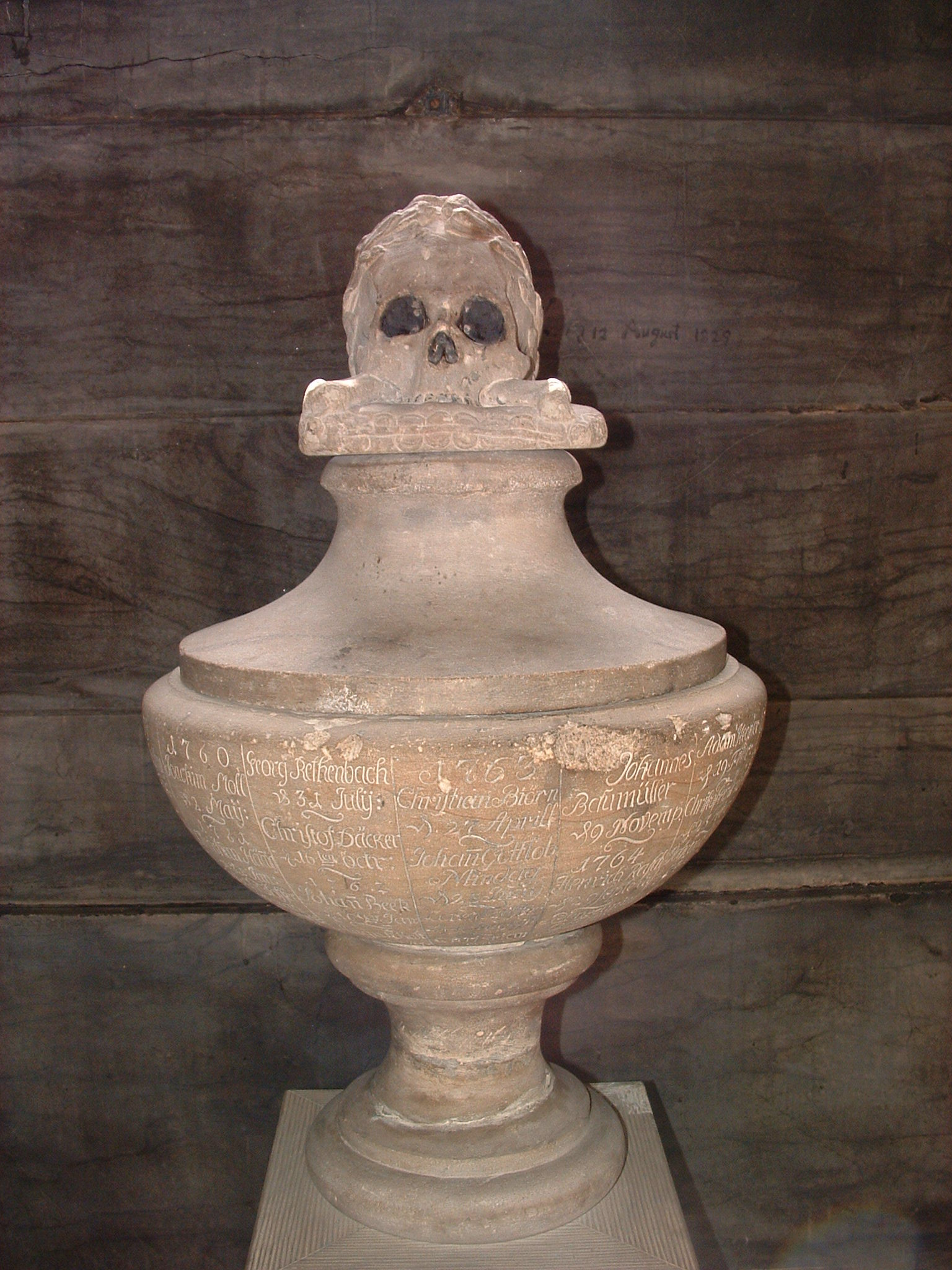
A memorial for the stone masons who were killed while building the church
