= Frederiksstaden =

District in Copenhagen

Coordinates: 55°41′04″N 12°35′33″E

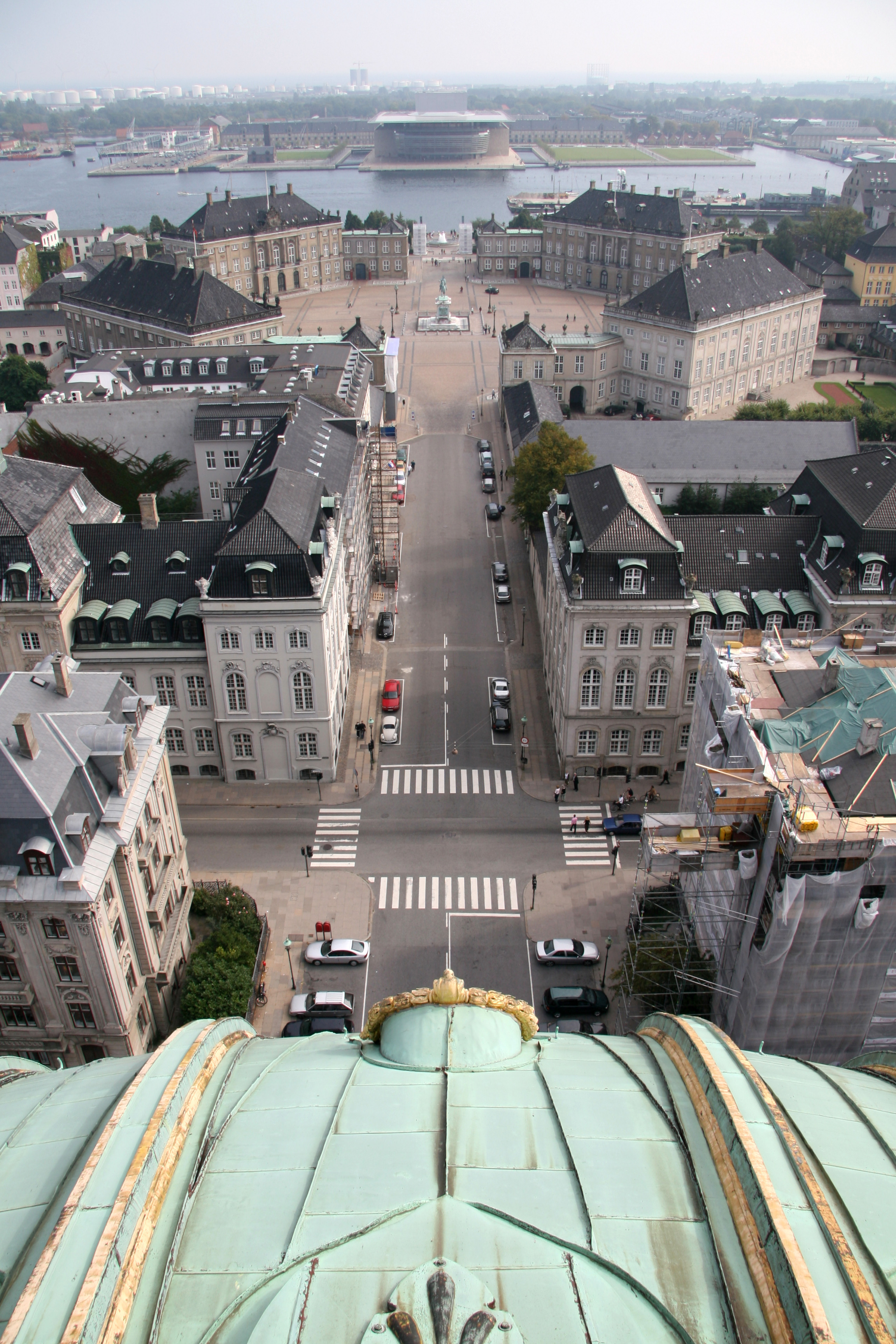
The central axis of Frederiksstaden as seen from Frederik's Church.

Frederiksstaden is a district in Copenhagen, Denmark. Constructed during the reign of Frederick V in the second half of the 18th century, it is considered to be one of the most important rococo complexes in Europe and was included in the 2006 Danish Culture Canon.

It was developed to commemorate the 300 years jubilee of the House of Oldenburg ascending to the Danish throne. A. G. Moltke was in charge of the project and Nicolai Eigtved was the main architect.

Frederiksstaden has Amalienborg Palace, the Danish residence palace complex with François Joseph Saly's equestrian statue monument to King Frederik V of Denmark in the middle of the octagonal plaza, and Frederik's Church at its center. Together they create an axis that was extended with the creation of the new Copenhagen Opera House in 2005 on the other side of the harbor basin. The district is characterized by straight broad streets in a straight-angled street layout. The streets are lined by bourgeois houses, mansions and palaces.

Another important building in the district is the royal Frederiks Hospital which was Denmark's first hospital in the present-day meaning of the word. It now houses the Danish Museum of Art & Design.

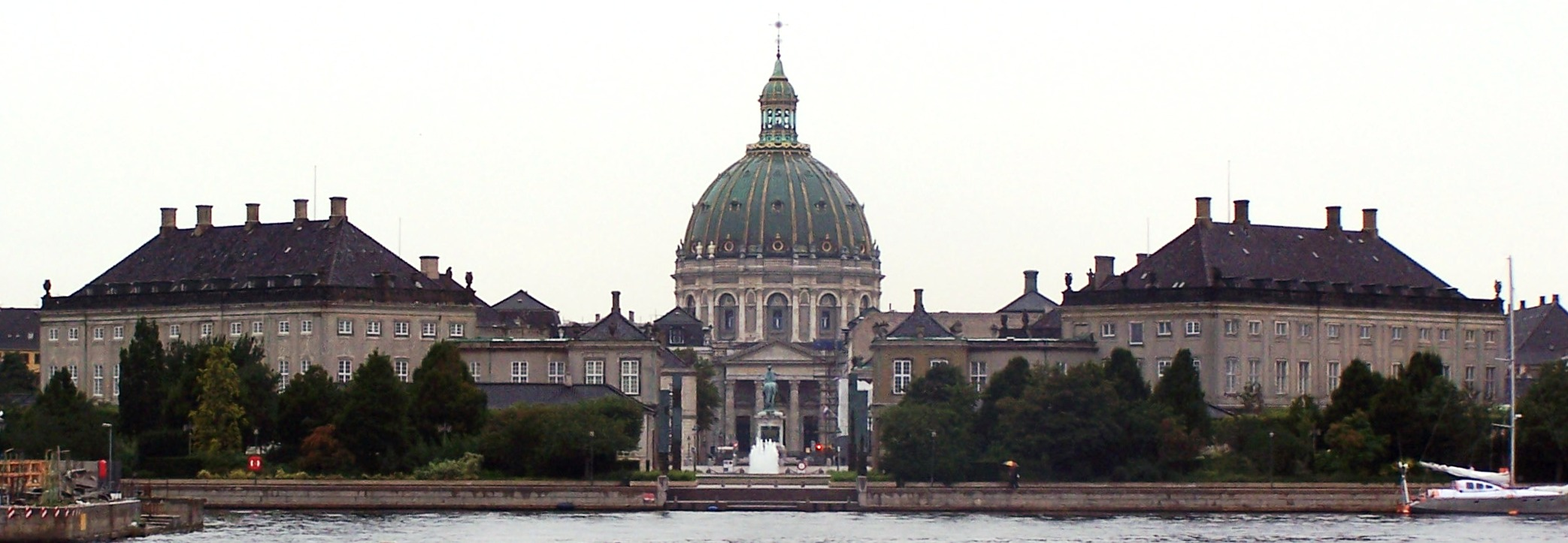
Panorama of The Palace and Fredericks Church

== Notable buildings ==
- Amalienborg
- Frederik's Church (The Marble Church)
- The Odd Fellow Mansion
- Moltke's Mansion
- Royal Danish Playhouse
- Østervold Kollegiet
