= Listed buildings in Hillerød Municipality =

This is a list of listed buildings in Hillerød Municipality, Denmark.

== The list ==
=== 3400 Hillerød ===
Listing name	Image	Location	Coordinates	Description
Annaborg		Frederiksværksgade 2A, 3400 Hillerød	55°56′6.3″N 12°17′47.5″E	House from the 18th century, now home to the Capital Region
Batzke's House		Batzkes Bakke 1, 3400 Hillerød	55°56′10.15″N 12°18′26.39″E	Former residence for the gardener at Frederiksborg Castle, built in 1720 to design by Johan Cornelius Krieger
Carlsberg		Københavnsvej 34A & B, 3400 Hillerød	55°55′49.9″N 12°19′0.51″E	House from 1750 and later
Carlsberg		Københavnsvej 34A & B, 3400 Hillerød	55°55′50.26″N 12°19′1.42″E	House from 1750 and later
Favrholm		Roskildevej 58, 3400 Hillerød	55°56′3.13″N 12°17′58.6″E	Farmhouse (north wing and connecting wing) from 1806
Frederiksborg Castle		Frederiksborg Slot 001, Hillerød	55°56′3.13″N 12°17′58.6″E	Kongefløjen:
Frederiksborg Castle		Frederiksborg Slot 1, 3400 Hillerød	55°56′3.13″N 12°17′58.6″E	Kirkefløjen:
Frederiksborg Castle		Frederiksborg Slot 1, 3400 Hillerød	55°56′3.13″N 12°17′58.6″E	Prinsessefløjen:
Frederiksborg Castle		Frederiksborg Slot 1, 3400 Hillerød	55°56′3.13″N 12°17′58.6″E	Arkadefløjen:
Frederiksborg Castle		Frederiksborg Slot 1, 3400 Hillerød	55°56′3.13″N 12°17′58.6″E	Gate tower
Frederiksborg Castle		Frederiksborg Slot 1, 3400 Hillerød	55°56′3.13″N 12°17′58.6″E	Møntporten:
Frederiksborg Castle		Frederiksborg Slot 1, 3400 Hillerød	55°56′3.13″N 12°17′58.6″E	Badstuen:
Frederiksborg Castle		Frederiksborg Slot 1, 3400 Hillerød	55°56′3.13″N 12°17′58.6″E	Slotsherrens hus:
Frederiksborg Castle		Frederiksborg Slot 1, 3400 Hillerød	55°56′3.13″N 12°17′58.6″E	Two western tower of two identical brick towers from 1562 situated in a complex close to the castle
Frederiksborg Castle		Frederiksborg Slot 2, 3400 Hillerød	55°56′0.88″N 12°17′57.68″E	Herluf Trolles Tårn: Building from 1561
Frederiksborg Castle		Frederiksborg Slot 4, 3400 Hillerød	55°56′2.15″N 12°17′59.48″E	The eastern tower of two identical brick towers from 1562 situated in a complex close to the castle
Frederiksborg Castle		Frederiksborg Slot 6, 3400 Hillerød	55°56′2.79″N 12°18′3.25″E	Kancellibygning from 1613 to 1614
Frederiksborg Latin School		Søndre Jernbanevej 4A, 3400 Hillerød	55°55′43.04″N 12°18′17.75″E	The original Frederiksborg State School from 1834 designed by Jørgen Hansen Koch
Frederiksværksgade 23		Frederiksværksgade 23A, 3400 Hillerød	55°56′7.66″N 12°17′37.48″E	Three detached residential wings from the 18th century and the cobbled courtyard
Frederiksværksgade 23		Frederiksværksgade 23E, 3400 Hillerød	55°56′7.36″N 12°17′36.05″E	Three detached residential wings from the 18th century and the cobbled courtyard
Frederiksværksgade 23		Frederiksværksgade 23F, 3400 Hillerød	55°56′6.94″N 12°17′36.82″E	Three detached residential wings from the 18th century and the cobbled courtyard
Hillerød Rectory		Kannikegade 2, 3400 Hillerød	55°55′44.68″N 12°18′18.35″E	Rectory from c. 1850 with barrel vaulted cellar from the Renaissance and the stone wall surrounding the garden
Lowzon House		Møllestræde 4, 3400 Hillerød	55°55′52.34″N 12°17′54.52″E	Rectory from 1760
Strødam		Gadevangsvej 109B, 3400 Hillerød	55°57′33.85″N 12°16′44.27″E	Former country house of C. F. Tietgen
Stud Master's House		Frederiksværksgade 39B, 3400 Hillerød	55°56′10.14″N 12°17′27.6″E	House from 1721, possibly by Johan Cornelius Krieger
Torvet 1		Torvet 1A, 3400 Hillerød	55°55′43.92″N 12°18′14.02″E	Complex consisting of two wings from 1834 and a rear wing from 1880

=== 3320 Skævinge ===
Listing name	Image	Location	Coordinates	Description
Skævinge Rectory		Ny Harløsevej 11, 3320 Skævinge	55°54′34.18″N 12°9′8.75″E	The residential western wing of four-winged rectory from 1746&bdasgM52
Skævinge Rectory		Ny Harløsevej 11, 3320 Skævinge	55°54′34.18″N 12°9′8.75″E	The south wing of four-winged rectory from 1746&bdasgM52
Skævinge Rectory		Ny Harløsevej 11, 3320 Skævinge	55°54′34.18″N 12°9′8.75″E	The north wing of four-winged rectory from 1746&bdasgM52
Skævinge Rectory		Ny Harløsevej 13A, 3320 Skævinge	55°54′33.53″N 12°9′9.26″E	Four-winged rectory from 1746&bdasgM52, the cobbled courtyard and lawn

=== 3480 Fredensborg ===
Listing name	Image	Location	Coordinates	Description
Skovridergården		Nødebovej 77A & E, 3480 Fredensborg	55°50′19.27″N 12°20′47.7″E	House from the early 19th century
Skovridergården		Nødebovej 77A & E, 3480 Fredensborg	55°50′19.27″N 12°20′47.7″E	House from the early 19th century
Skovridergården		Nødebovej 77A & E, 3480 Fredensborg	55°50′19.27″N 12°20′47.7″E	House from the early 19th century
Skovridergården		Nødebovej 77A & E, 3480 Fredensborg	55°50′19.27″N 12°20′47.7″E	House from the early 19th century

== See also ==
- List of protected areas of Hillerød Municipality
