= Stud Master's House =

Building in Hillerød Municipality, Denmark

- Stutmesterens Hus
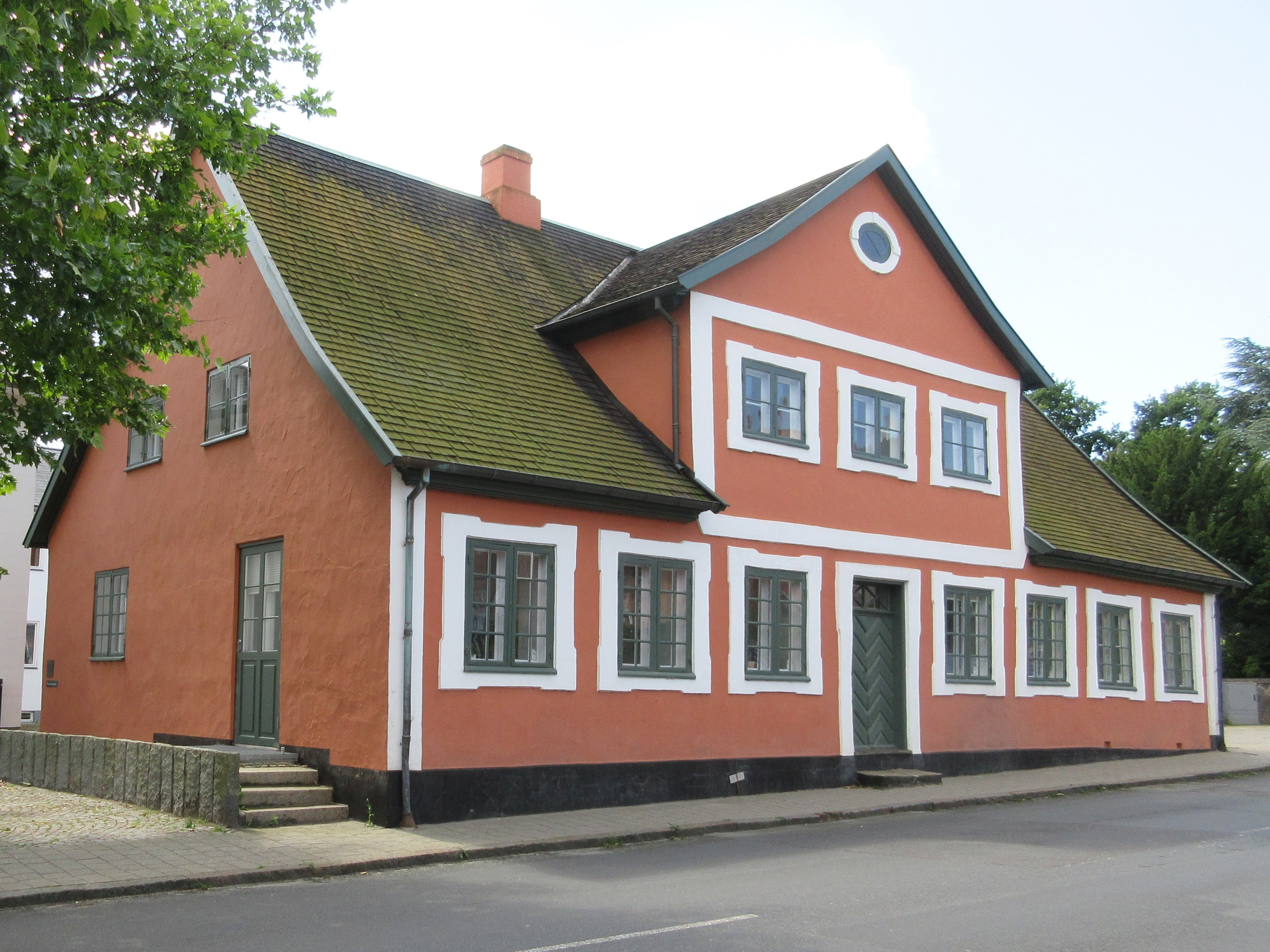
- Interactive map of the Stud Master's House area

General information
- Location: Frederiksværksgade 39B, 3400 Hillerød, Denmark
- Coordinates: 55°56′10.14″N 12°17′27.6″E
- Completed: 1723

The Stud Master's House (Danish: Stutmesterens Hus), situated on Frederiksværksgade, west of Frederiksborg Castle, was built for the stable master at the Royal Frederiksborg Stud in Hillerød, Denmark. It was built in 1723 to a design by Royal Building Inspector Johan Cornelius Krieger and is fairly similar to nearby Batzke's House which was also designed by Krieger. The house was in the first half of the 19th century for a while used as a school under the name Nyhuse Skole. It was listed in the Danish registry of protected buildings and places in 1919.

== History ==
Frederiksborg Stud was established close to Frederick II's new Frederiksborg Castle in 1562. Christian IV shared his father's interest in horse breeding and expanded the activities, both through the acquisition of probably mostly Spanish horses and a more professional management. He is therefore often seen as the real founder of Frederiksborg Stud. The crown was at this point also the owner of stud farms at Esrom, Jægerspris, Antvorskov, Ringsted and Skanderborg.

After the introduction of the absolute monarchy in 1660, with inspiration from France, it became an ideal that the royal chariots should be drawn by horses of uniform appearance and sound. The horses were therefore arranged in studs of approximately 17 mares of identical colour. The most prestigious of these was the "white stud", which delivered horses for royal parades and other special events. The Frederiksborg horses gained a reputation throughout Europe.

Christian VI's decision to merge all the royal stud farms under Frederiksborg Stud created a need for larger premises and more residences for the increasing number of employees. Many of these buildings were constructed along Frederiksbærksgade, between the stud farm and the castle. The stud master had until then resided at Sparepenge, a royal pavilion in Lille Dyrehave, but this building was pulled down in 1719. The Stable Master's House on Frederiksværksgade completed in 1823 to design by Johan Cornelius Krieger.

In 1833, it was decided to downscale the activities of the Royal Frederiksborg Stud due to high operational costs and a combination of high mortality and low fertility among the mares. The Stud Master's House was around that time converted into a school under the name Nyhuse Skole (New Houses School). The school was later moved.

In 1871, after several unsuccessful attempts to revive it, Frederiksborg Stud was sold to a group of private investors headed by C. F. Tietgen. It was later ceded to a limited company and closed in 1894. Most of the surrounding buildings were demolished in the years after 1862.

== See also ==
- Hørsholm Riding Club
- Staldmestergården
