= Carlsberg, Hillerød =

Carlsberg
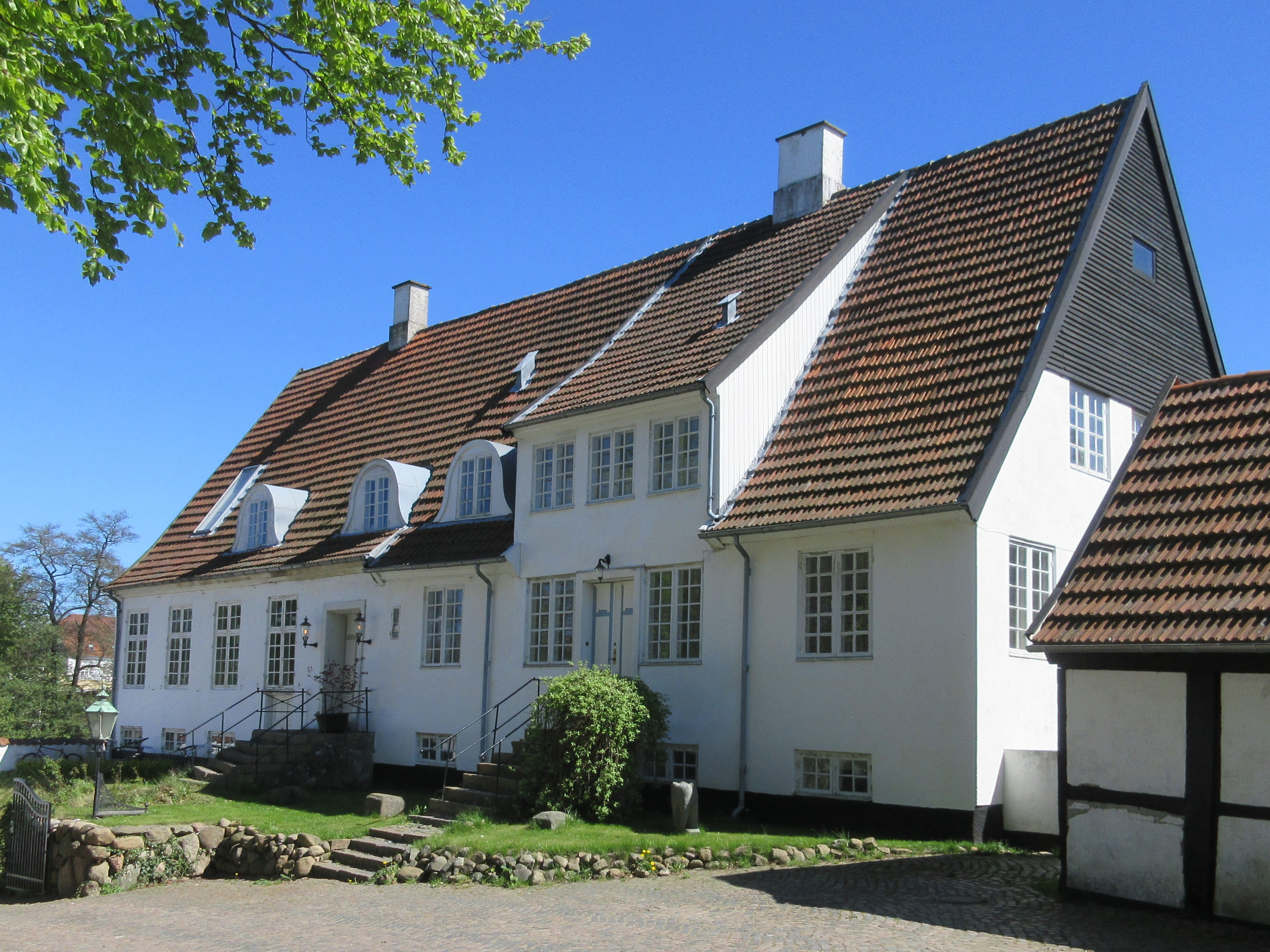
- Interactive map of the Carlsberg area

General information
- Location: Københavnsvej 34A & B, 3400 Hillerød, Denmark
- Coordinates: 55°55′49.91″N 12°19′0.52″E
- Completed: 1750s

Carlsberg (also spelled Karlsberg), formerly known as the Fishing Master's House (Danish: Fiskemesterhuset), is a house and former estate located on Københavnsvej at the southeastern entrance to Hillerød, Denmark. The property traces its history back to the first half of the 18th century but the current two residential units building was constructed in the 1750s. A number of artists have resided in the building in the late 19th and early 20th century, including Viggo Pedersen and Niels Skovgaard. It was listed in the Danish registry of protected buildings and places in 1949. The nearby road Carlsbergvej is named after the property.

== History ==
The property traces its history back to 1628 when Christian IV presented castle clerk (slotsskriver) Johan Bøgvad with three bogs in the vicinity of Hillerød. Bøgvad's intention was to turn them into fishing ponds. One of them was located close to the site where Carlsberg stands today. This property changed hands several times during the second half of the century and the ownership was sometimes divided between two people. Many of the owners were royal fishing masters and the house was therefore known as the Fishing Master's House. Other early owners included a headmaster of Frederiksborg Latin School and a blacksmith.

Many of the high-ranking guests who visited Hillerød in connection with the coronation of Frederick V on 4 September 1848 at Frederiksborg Castle stayed in private homes across the town. The Duke of Glücksburg and his entourage stayed in the Fishing Master's House.

The estate was in 1754 owned by royal fishing master Knud Carlsen. He constructed the current building but the section now known as No. 34B incorporates elements from an older house dating from the 17th century. A fire insurance policy from 1781 describes a house nine bays long, built partly in masonry and partly with timber framing, standing on a masonry cellar with two kitchens and a utility room. Attached to this building was a seven-bay-long secondary wing with thatched roof, built partly in masonry and partly with timber framing, containing smaller rooms and a utility room as well as a ten-bay combined stable and carriagehouse and another building, 20 bays long, with stables, carriagehouse and barn.

The Carlsberg estate was in 1794 owned by a member of the Rantzau family with the title of Hofjægermester. It was bought in 1810 by Cornelius Lerche.

In the late 19th and early 20th centuries, the house was let out to a number of artists and an atelier was installed in each end in connection with it. The painter Viggo Pedersen lived with his family in one of the two dwellings from 1898 to 1911 and has painted a number of paintings of the house and its surroundings.

Viggo Pedersen belonged to P. C. Skovgaard's social circle, whom he had studied under in his youth. Skovgaard's son Niels Skovgaard was a tenant in the dwelling in the building from 1900 to 1916. Niels Skovgaard was a member of Hillerød's independent Grundtvigian congregation (valgmenighed) and contributed to the design and decoration of Ullerød Church on a site next to Frederiksborg Folk High School.

== Gallery ==
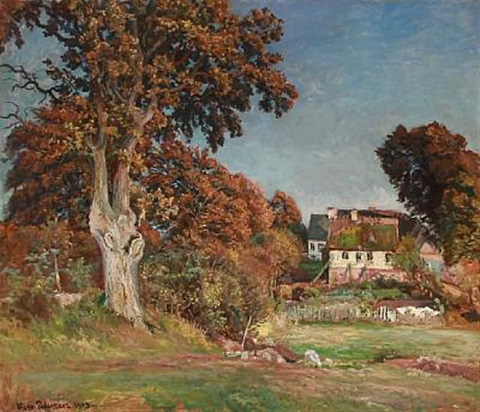
Viggo Pedersen: Carlsberg. October Afternoon (1903)

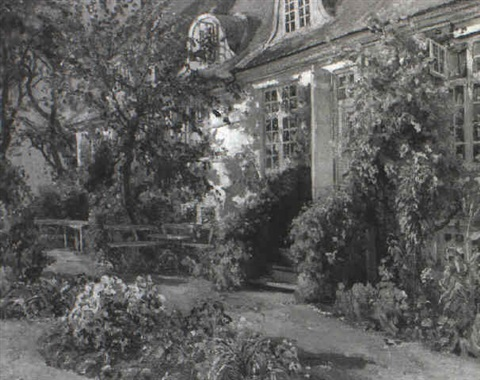
Viggo Pedersen: The artist's home Karlsberg in Hillerød

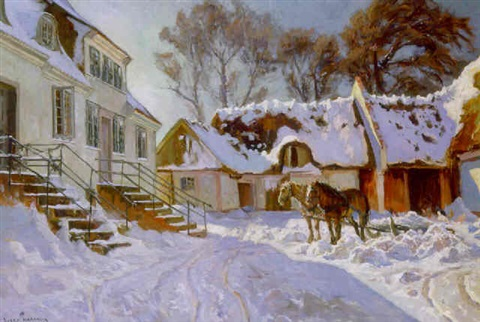
Viggo Pedersen: Winter day at Carlsberg in Hillerød

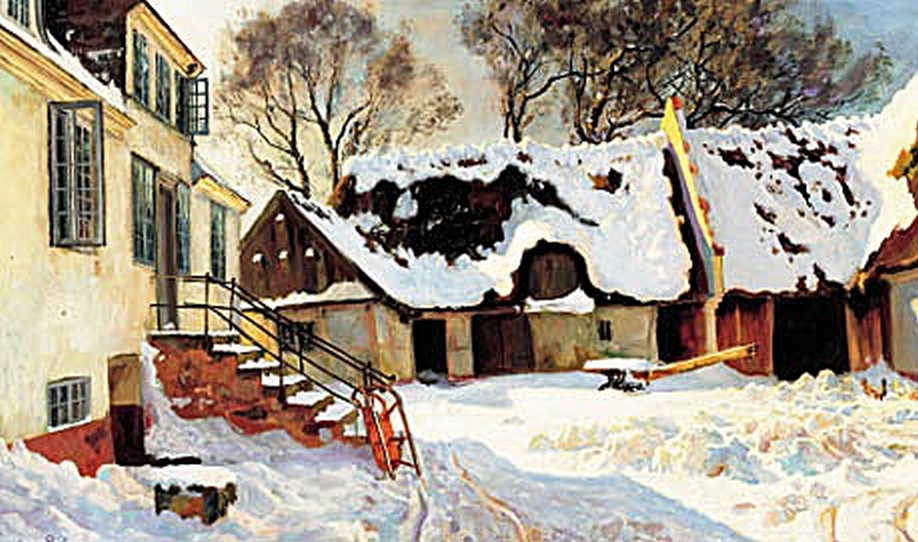
Viggo Pedersen: Winter day at Carlsberg, Hillerød

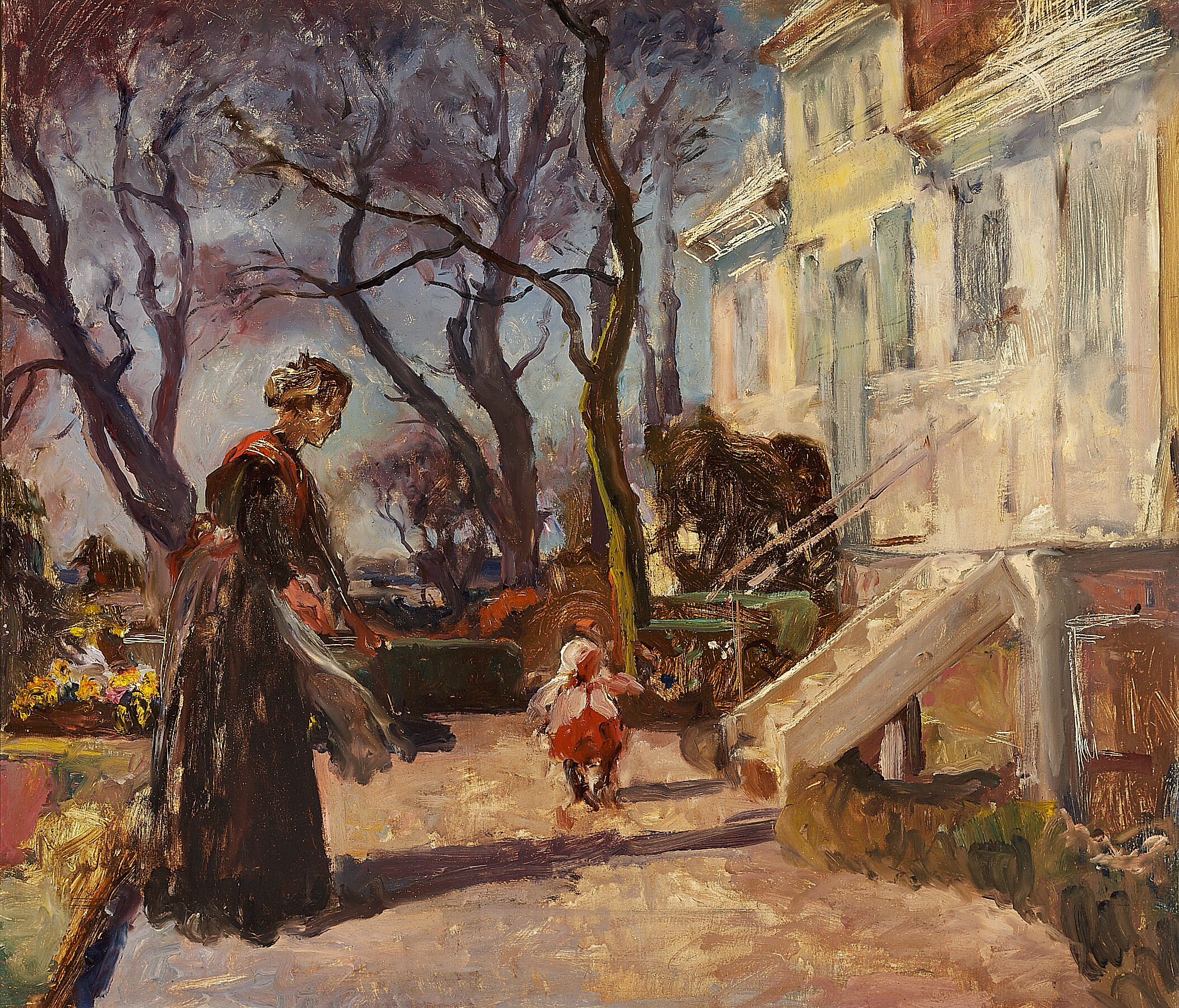
Viggo Pedersen: An Early Spring Day. From the Garden at Karlsberg, Hillerød

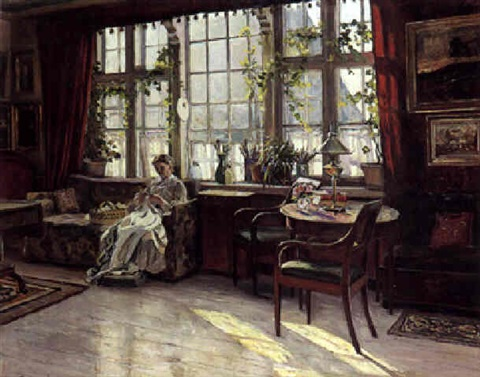
Viggo Pedersen: Afternoon Sun Through the Large Window. The Artist's Wife Sowing (1904)
