= Fredericiagade =

Street in Copenhagen, Denmark

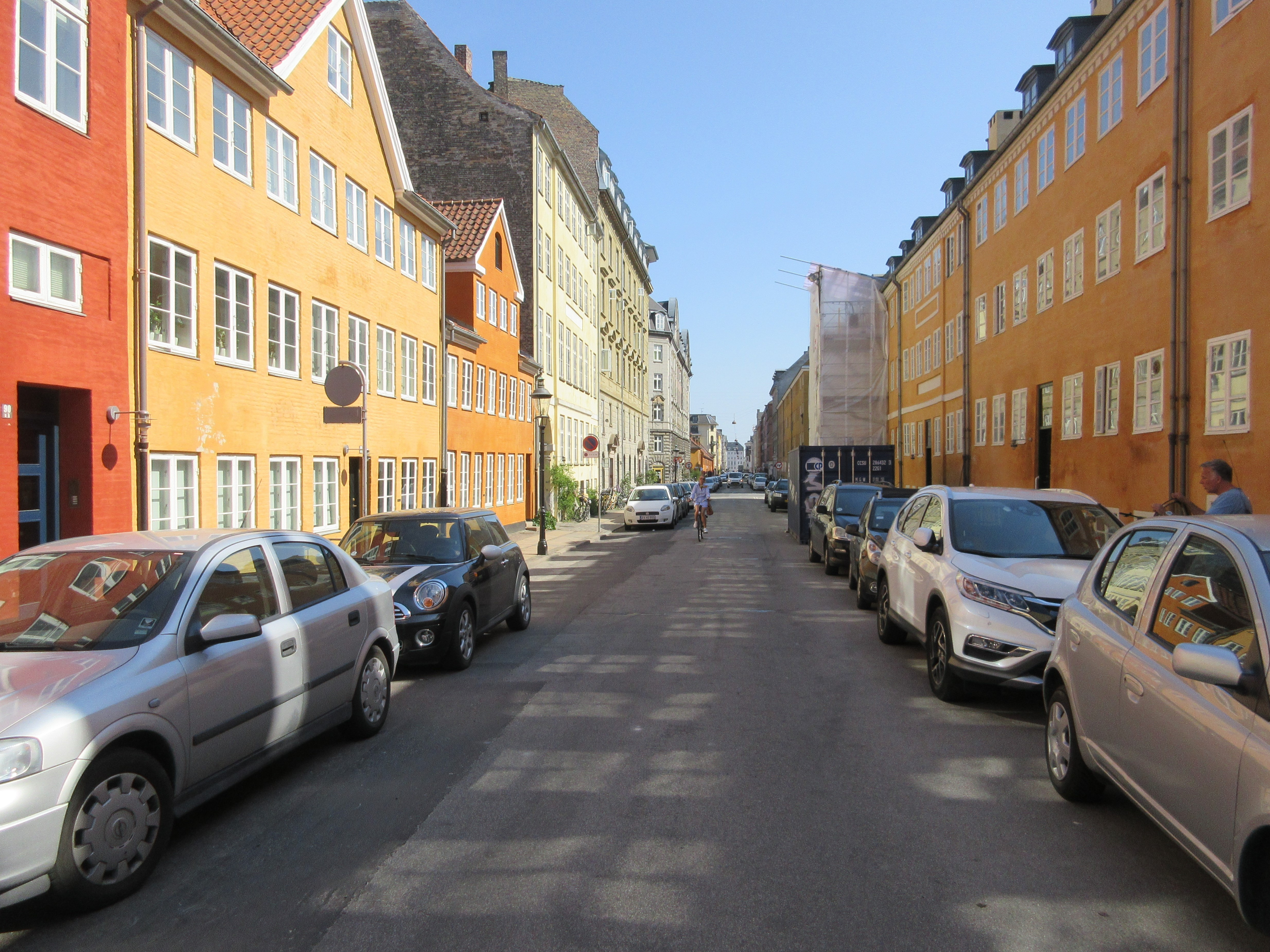
- Interactive map of Fredericiagade
- Length: 755 m (2,477 ft)
- Location: Indre By, Copenhagen, Denmark
- Postal code: 1310
- Nearest metro station: Nørreport
- Coordinates: 55°41′10.57″N 12°35′19.1″E

Fredericiagade (Danish pronunciation: [fʁeðɐˈʁetɕæˌkɛːðə, fʁæðɐˈʁæt-]) is a street in central Copenhagen, Denmark. It runs from Amaliegade in the south to Rigensgade in the north.

== History ==
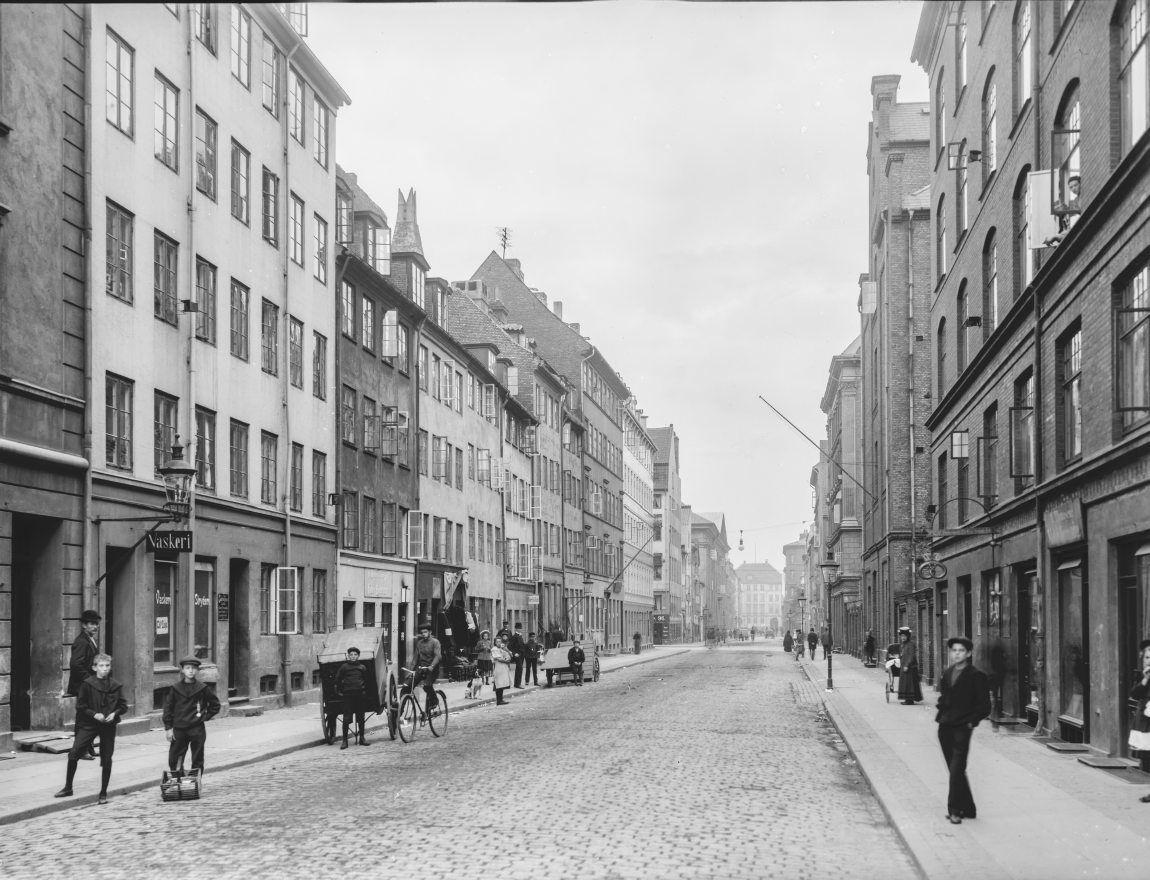
Fredericiagade

Fredericiagade traces its history back to Christian IV's foundation of Nyboder naval barracks in 1631, but different sections of it were then known under individual names. The section from Amaliegade to Bredgade was called Blancogade. The origins of the name are unclear. The section from Bredgade to Store Kongensgade was variously referred to as Akademigade (Academy Street) and Kadetgade (Cadet Street). Both names referred to the Cadet Academy which was located in the street. The sections from Store Kongensgade to Borgergade was called Kaninlængen (The Rabbit Row) and the section from Borgergade to Adelgade was called Bjørnegade (Bear Street). The section from Adelgade to Kronprinsessegade was called Nellikegade. The section from Kronprinsessegade to Rigensgade was called Kokkegade (Cook Street).

The name Fredericiagade was introduced in 1869 at the initiative of city engineer Thorvald Krak to reduce the vast and confusing number of street names in the city. The new name was chosen to honour the town of Fredericia for its role in the Three Years' War.

== Notable buildings and residents ==
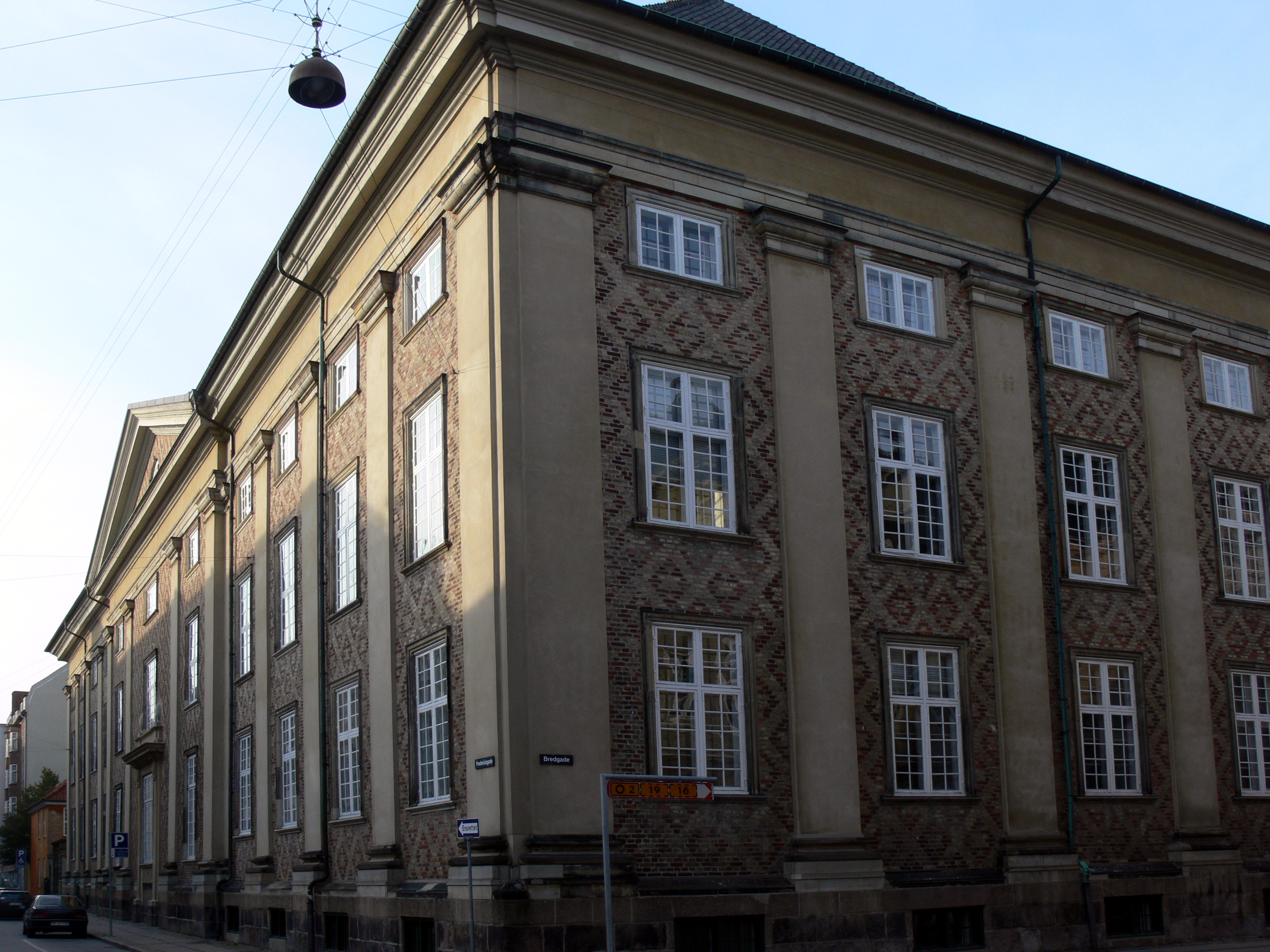
Østre Landsret

The building at the corner with Bredgade has housed Østre Landsret since 1918. It was originally built as opera house from Frederick IV in 1701–02, and was either designed by W.F. von Platen or J.C. Ernst. It was later used as a Cadet Academy, and was also used by Rigsdagen after the fire of Christiansborg Palace.

The Hansen Mansion (No. 21) is a town mansion from 1835 designed by Jørgen Hansen Koch.

The apartment buildings at No. 4, No. 8, No. 12 and No. 14 all date from the first half of the 1850s and are also listed.
