= Hillerød Rectory =

Building in Hillerød, Denmark

- Hillerød Præstegård
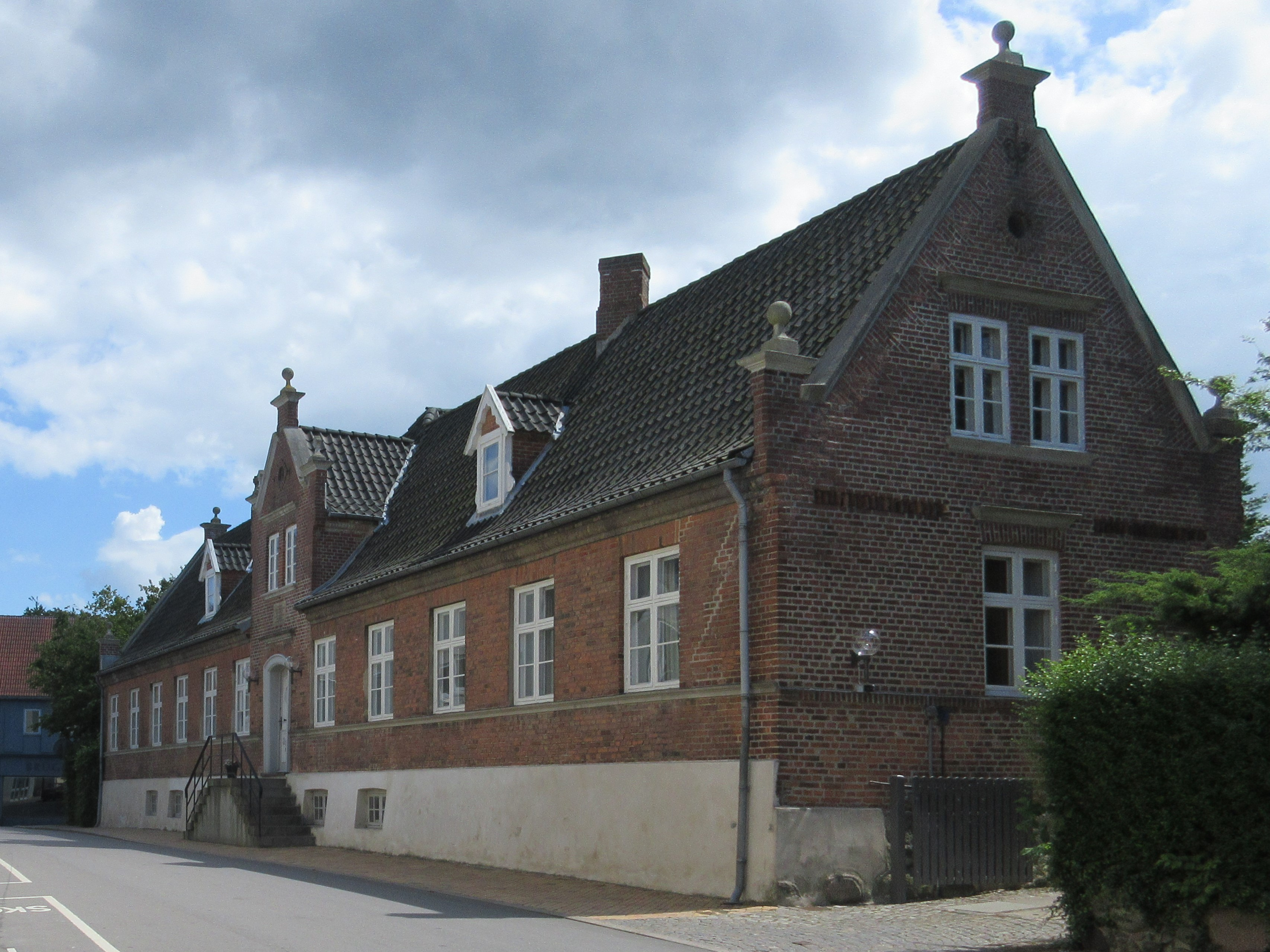
- Interactive map of the Hillerød Rectory area

General information
- Location: Kannikegade 2, 3400 Hillerød, Denmark
- Coordinates: 55°55′44.69″N 12°18′18.36″E
- Completed: 1860s

Hillerød Rectory (Danish: Hillerød Præstegård) is located close to the central market square in Hillerød, Denmark. The building owes its current appearance to a comprehensive renovation from the 1860s but it stands on a vaulted cellar from the 17th century. A plaque above the main entrance commemorates that Peder Hersleb lived in the building from 1718 to 1724. The building was listed in the Danish registry of protected buildings and places in 1979.

== History ==
A rectory in Hillerød is first mentioned in connection with the appointment of Søren Olsen as pastor at Frederiksborg Castle in 1567 and again in connection with the appointment of Frantz Nielsen as his successor in 1573. They were both granted free residency in a building referred to as Filkenstrup but it is not known where it was located.

In 1590, the king acquired another property with the intention of turning it into a clergy house for the new castle priest Sørensen Stub. The building was most likely located between Mørkegade (now Østergade) and the old cemetery.

Gillerød and the surrounding countryside belonged to the rural parishes of Tjæreby, Nørre Herlev and Grønholt. Frederiksborg Chapel was however not only used by members and employees of the royal court but also by other residents of the growing town around the castle. The king disproved of this situation and a new church was therefore built in 1629. Hillerød was at the same time divided into two new parishes, Frederiksborg Slotssogn (Frederiksborg Castle Parish) for members of the royal court and Hillerød Sogn (Hillerød Parish) for others residents. The same pastor served both parishes but was still referred to as slotspræst ("castle pastor").

In 1718, Peder Hersleb was appointed as pastor of Frederiksborg and Hillerod. In 1725, he moved to Copenhagen as priest in the Danish royal court.

The current rectory was first acquired as the private property of reverend Hans Husvig )1611-1679). He had most likely not been satisfied with the official rectory and being due to his lucrative marriage to one of Peder Griffenfeld could afford a better alternative. It is believed that the building had originally served as an inn. The large barrel-vaulted cellar with fine Renaissance style masonry similar to that of the cellar under Frederiksborg Castle supports this theory. The crown acquired the building from Husvig's heirs in 1671.

Jens Christian Hostrup was castle pastor in from 1862 to 1881. Hillerød Rectory was on his initiative subject to a comprehensive renovation undertaken by the architect Christian Zwingmann in the 1860s. He had also been in charge of the renovation of Frederiksborg Chapel following the Fire of Frederiksborg Castle in 1859.

== Architecture ==
The rectory is a one-storey building constructed in red brick on top of a raised cellar. The cellar dates from the previous building at the site and features two barrel vaults. Above the main entrance is a tall gabled wall dormer. The roof is clad with red tile. A sjort, three bays wide garden wing from the centre of the rear side of the building.
