= Hostrups Have =

Housing estate in Copenhagen, Denmark

Coordinates: 55.6842°N 12.5392°E

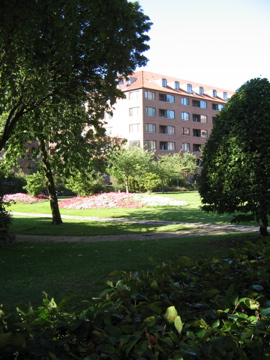
Hostrups Have. The 1936 flower garden with the west wing in the background.

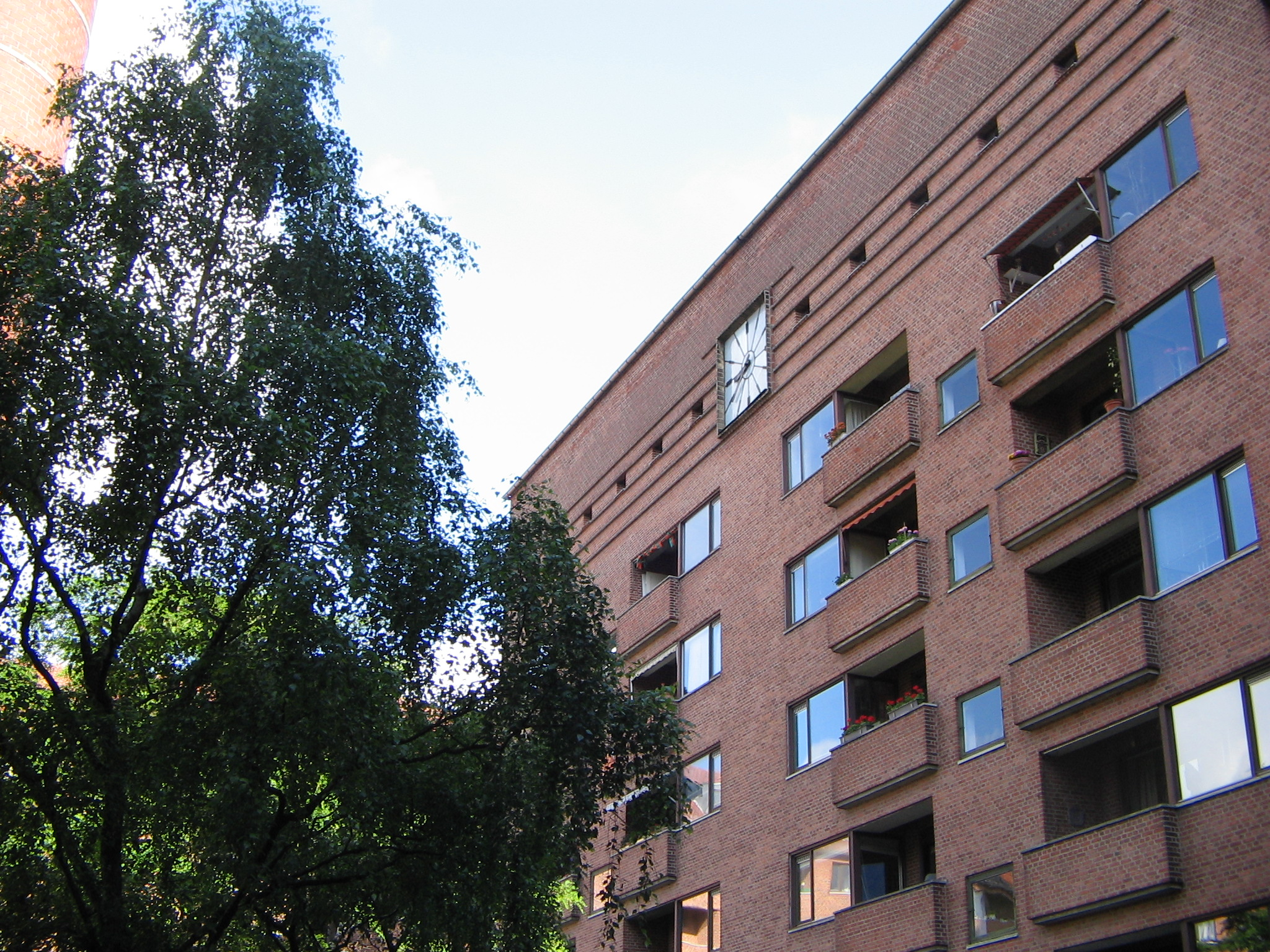
The north wing of Hostrups Have overviewing the gardens - and with the grand glass clock - illuminated in the evening.

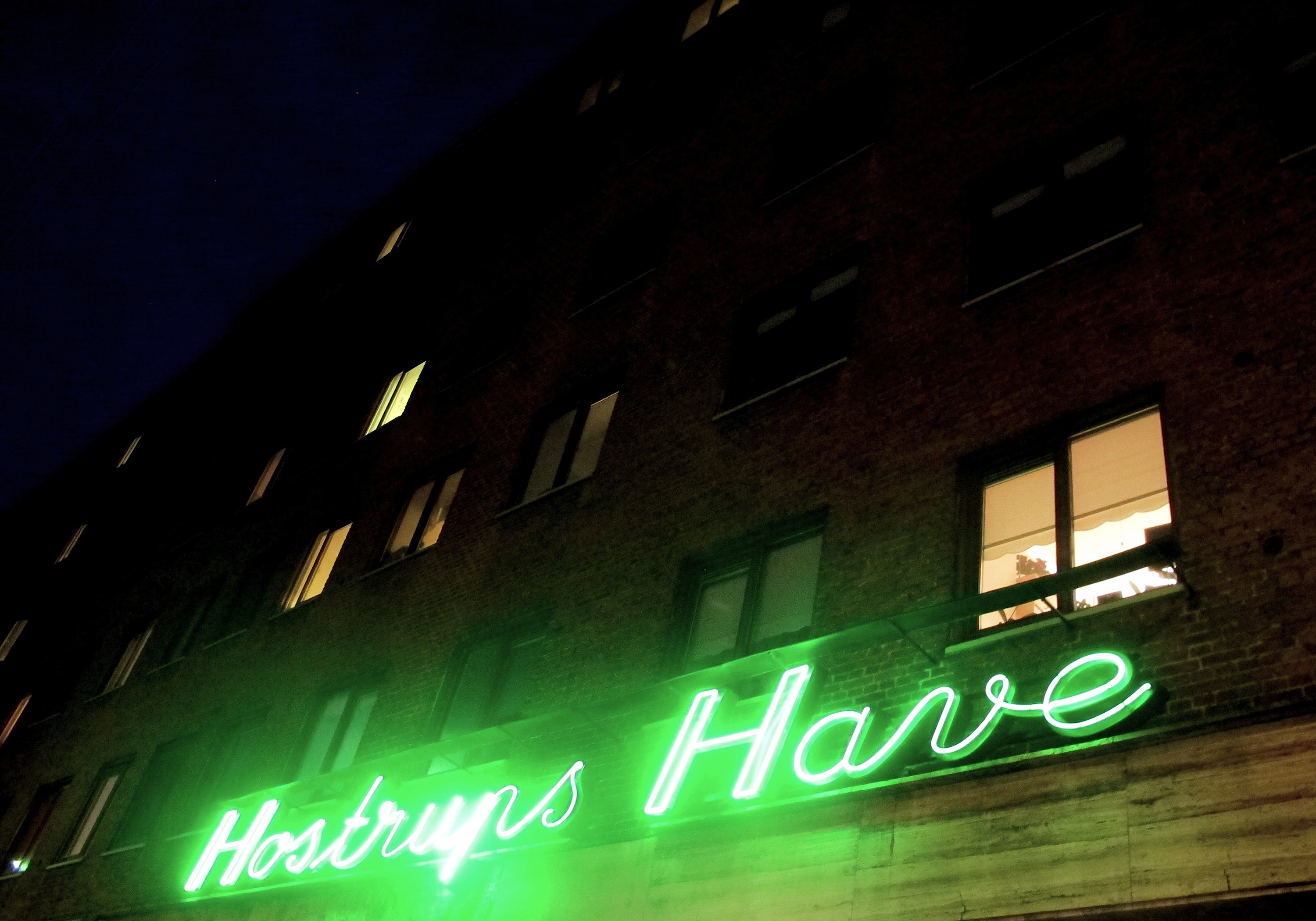
The original 1936-neon sign "Hostrups Have" above the main entrance to the gardens.

Hostrups Have (lit. "Hostrup's Garden") is a famous functionalist housing estate and associated green space located at the corner of Falkoner Allé and Rolighedsvej in the Frederiksberg district of Copenhagen, Denmark. Designed by Danish architect Hans Dahlerup Berthelsen in 1935–36. Hostrups Have is named after the playwright Jens Christian Hostrup. It has its own post code (1954 Frederiksberg C).

== History ==
The housing development is located at the site of the old Rubens Klædefabrik, a textile factory which opened at the site in 1857. It closed and was demolished in 1927.

Hostrups Have was built by the developer Harald Simonsen. The development was designed by the architect Hans Dahlerup Berthelsen. The foundation stone was set by prime minister Thorvald Stauning on 20 June 1935. The housing estate was inaugurated in 1936. It was named after the author Jens Christian Hostrup who used to live at nearby villa "Rolighed".

In 2007, Hostrups Have was converted into an andelsforening. In 2017 sold to Heimstaden.

== Architecture ==
Hostrups Have is a typical example of the Danish Functionalist style which became popular in the 1930s. The three winged complex is built over five storeys in brick with granite and travertine detailing at the entrances. All apartments have balconies. A neon sign from 1937 with the name of the complex is located above the main gate on Rolighedsvej. A glass clock located at the top of the north wing is illuminated at night. The complex originally integrated the 45-metre tall chimney from the former factory but it was removed in July 2014.

Hostrups Have consists of 680 apartments and have a total area of 60,000 square metres. It originally also comprised 30 commercial tenancies.

== The garden ==
The garden space in the centre of Hostrups Have consists of lawns, old solitaire trees and perennial flower beds. Artworks include the sculpture "Hvilende Kvinde" (Resting Woman) from 1937 by Danish artist Gunnar Hammerich. Another sculpture depicts the Danish actor Poul Reumert as "lieutenant von Buddinge" in Hostrup's play Genboerne. The sculpture was created by Henning Koppel and is from the late 1970s.

== Notable residents ==
- Børge Mogensen^, architect and designer, lived and worked at Hostrups Have 24.
- Jens Otto Krag, politician and later prime minister, lived at Hostrups Have 60 in the 1950s
- Klaus Rifbjerg, author, lived at Hostrups Have 31 and later Skt. Nikolaj Vej 13 in the late 1950s.
- Marguerite Viby, actress, lived at Hostrups Have 28 with her daughter Susse Wold
- Preben Neergaard and Birgitte Reimer, actor and actress, lived at Hostrups Have 56 in the late 1950s and early 1960s
- Emil Hass Christensen, actor, lived at Hostrups Have 20.
- Ellen Jansø, actress, lived at Hostrups Have 3.
- Beatrice Bonnesen, actress, lived at Hostrups Have 29.
- Erika Voigt, actress, lived at Hostrups Have 24.
- Lilly Lamprecht, royal chamber singer, lived at Hostrups Have 4.
- Leo Mathisen, jazz musician, lived at Hostrups Have 20 in 1937–38.
- Frederik Zeuthen, economist and professor, lived at Hostrups Have.
- Poul Schlüter, politician and later prime minister, lived at Hostrups Have (Sankt Nikolaj Vej).

== Cultural references ==
A psychologist lives in Hostrup's Have in Hans Scherfig's Idealister
