= Jens Christian Hostrup =

Danish poet, dramatist and priest (1818–1892)

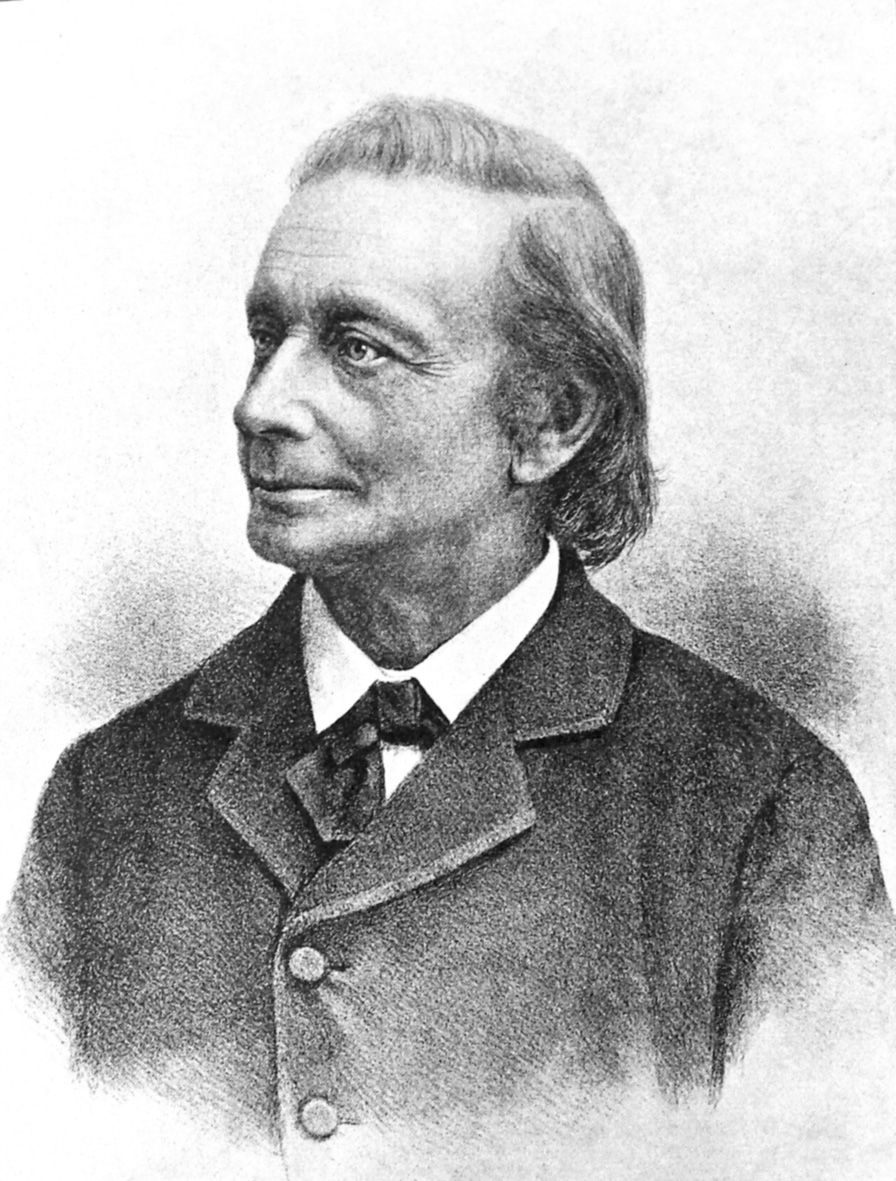
- Jens Christian Hostrup
- Born: May 20, 1818; Copenhagen, Denmark
- Died: November 21, 1892 (aged 74); Frederiksberg

Jens Christian Hostrup (20 May 1818 in Copenhagen – 21 November 1892 in Frederiksberg) was a Danish poet, dramatist and priest. Comforting and encouraging the people, he created poems that filled the hearts of his compatriots. His precise personal and environmental descriptions, as well as succinct dialogue, were welcomed by the critics and contemporaries. His dramas were on current topics such as feminism, free love and home, maybe one of the reasons why he often used the pseudonym Jens Kristrup (Christrup).

== Life ==
Son of Peter Hostrup and Carol Anne Johanne, née Irgens, the young Jens was raised in a musical family. His father played the violin, but died shortly after 1830. He began his studies at the Metropolitan College and was admitted to the literature and drama class in 1837. After 1837 he began studying theology. He lived in the students dorm and took part in student associations, entering into a number of contacts and making new friends, including the writer Adam Oehlenschläger, and gaining literary experience. He graduated as Cand. theol. in 1843. After his studies, Hostrup worked as a tutor and pastor.

In 1844 he wrote the comedy Gjenboerne for the party of the students association, and after that he began to write a songplay, an act which inspired the poets Johan Ludvig Heiberg and Ferdinand Raimund. While he was tutor at Kokkedal from 1844 to 1847, he wrote Intrigues in 1845, A sparrow in Crane Dance in 1846 and Tales of Walking Tour in 1847, and more dramas in various genres followed. His first marriage was with Henriette Wilhelmine Louise Mantzius (1824–1849) on 2 November 1848. She was the sister of his friend, actor Kristian Mantzius. After her death he traveled to Rome in 1854 and on his return became pastor of Silkeborg in 1855. He became then engaged with Christiane Georgine Elizabeth Hauch, daughter of Carsten Hauch, with whom he married in 1855. They had one son named Helge Hostrup (1862–1949). In 1862 he became pastor of Frederiksborg Castle in Hillerød. He instigated a comprehensive renovation of Hillerød Rectory.

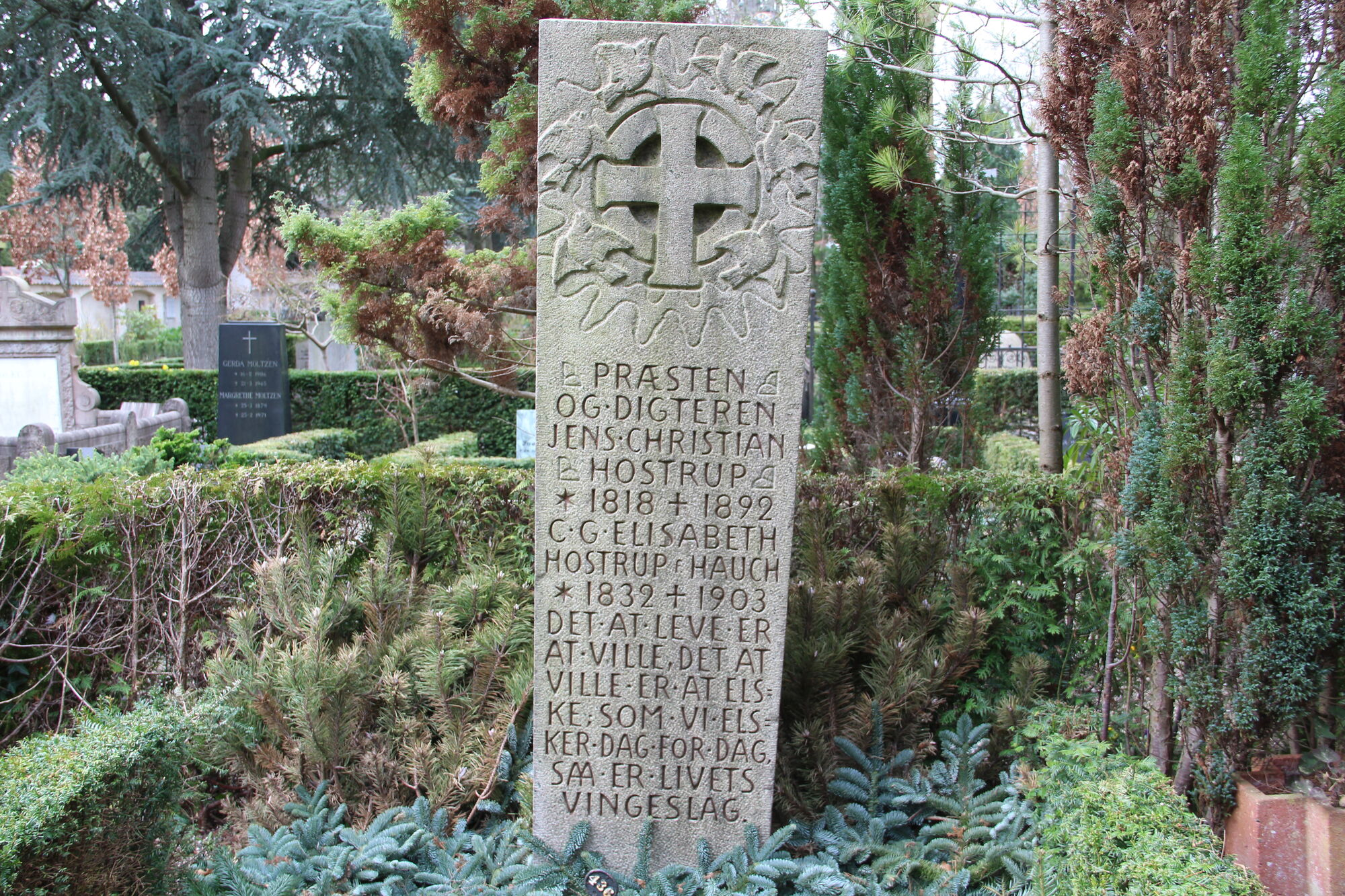
Jens Christian Hostrup's tombstone at Frederiksberg Old Cemetery.

Hostrup published two collections of poems, Sermons in 1866, and the devotional book The resurrection and the life in 1883, Popular Lectures in 1882 and The defeat in 1864. In 1872 appeared Songs and poems from thirty years, in 1884 Songs and poems from the past few years and after his death came in 1893 Posthumous Poems. His only hymn Christmas message to those who build has a background in heavy personal sorrows and the illness that forced him from office in 1881. He moved to Frederiksberg and died there on 21 November 1892. He is buried at Frederiksberg Old Cemetery.

The street Hostrups Vej and the residential functionalist complex Hostrups Have in Copenhagen are named after Jens Christian Hostrup

== Literature ==
- Genboerne (1844)
- Tales of Journey on Foot (1847)
- Recollections of my Childhood and Youth (1891)
- Later Memoirs (1893)
- Comedy (1900)
- Jens Christian Hostrup : hans liv og gerning [Jens Christian Hostrup: His Life and Work] by Helge Hostrup, Copenhagen: Gyldendal (1916), OCLC 10205866
