= Annaborg =

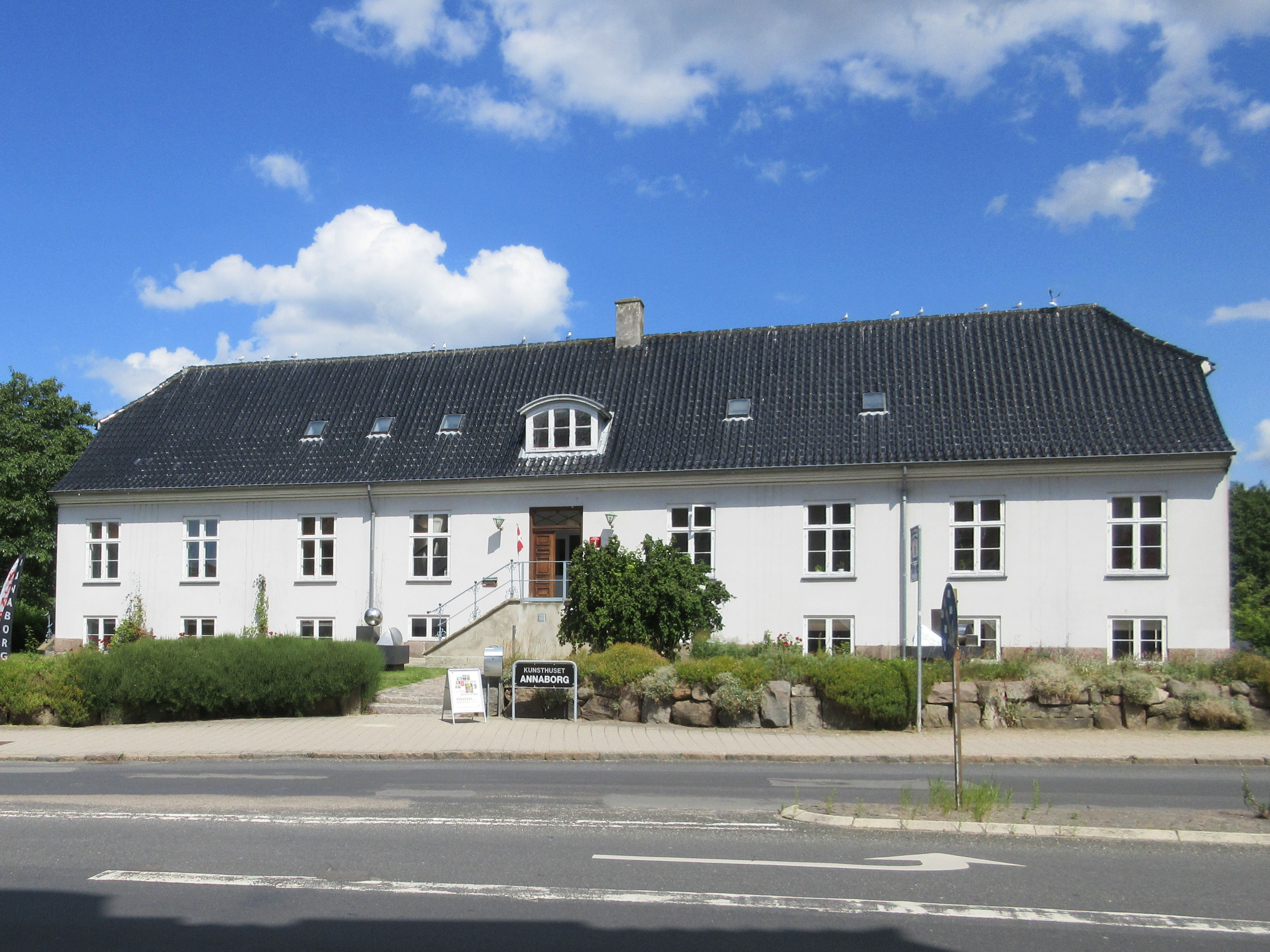
- Interactive map of the Annaborg area

General information
- Location: Frederiksværksgade 2A, 3400 Hillerød, Denmark
- Coordinates: 55°56′6.29″N 12°17′47.51″E
- Completed: 1783
- Client: Hinrich Ladiges

Annaborg, formerly also known as Amtsstuegården, is a Neoclassical building from 1783 now operated as a venue for temporary art exhibitions in Hillerød, Denmark. It is located adjacent to Frederiksborg Castle and was until 1939 home to the headquarters of Frederiksborg County. It was listed in the Danish registry of protected buildings and places in 1945.

== History ==
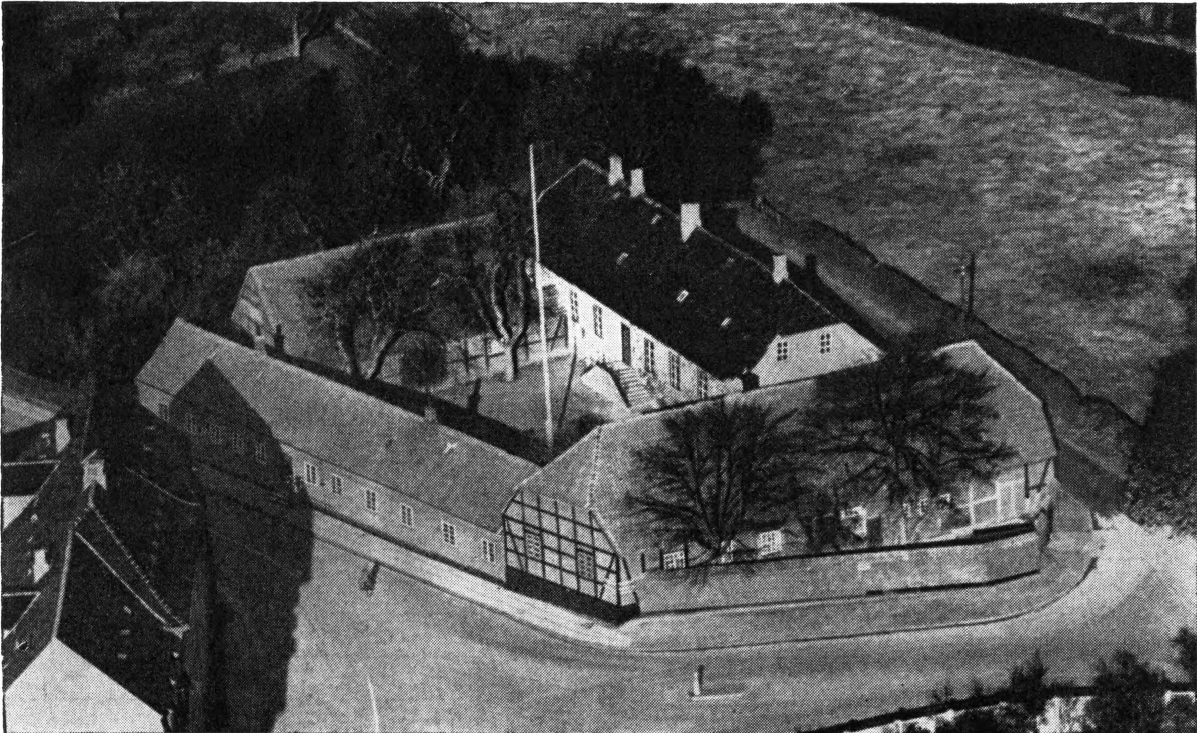
Annaborg

The building was constructed in 1782-83 by county manager (amtsforvalter) Frederik Christian Brammer who named it Annaborg after his wife Anna. The building seen today is the former main wing of a four-winged complex. The long, low half-timbered south wing contained the county office, The two shorther east and west wings contained horse stables and storage space for firewood as well as a barn used for the grain peasants paid as a Tithe.

The building has later been used as residence for Frederiksborg County's CFO. The new Frederiksborg County Headqyarters was completed in 1939 and is now home to Hillerød Sognegård.

During World War II, it was confiscated by the German occupying forces. In 1947, architect Carl Lundquist was charged with converting the building into office space.

The building is today owned by Hillerød Municipality and rented out to Hillerød Kunstforening.

== Today ==
The building is now operated by Hillerød Art Society as an exhibition centre.
