= Favrholm =

Manor house in Hillerød Municipality, Denmark

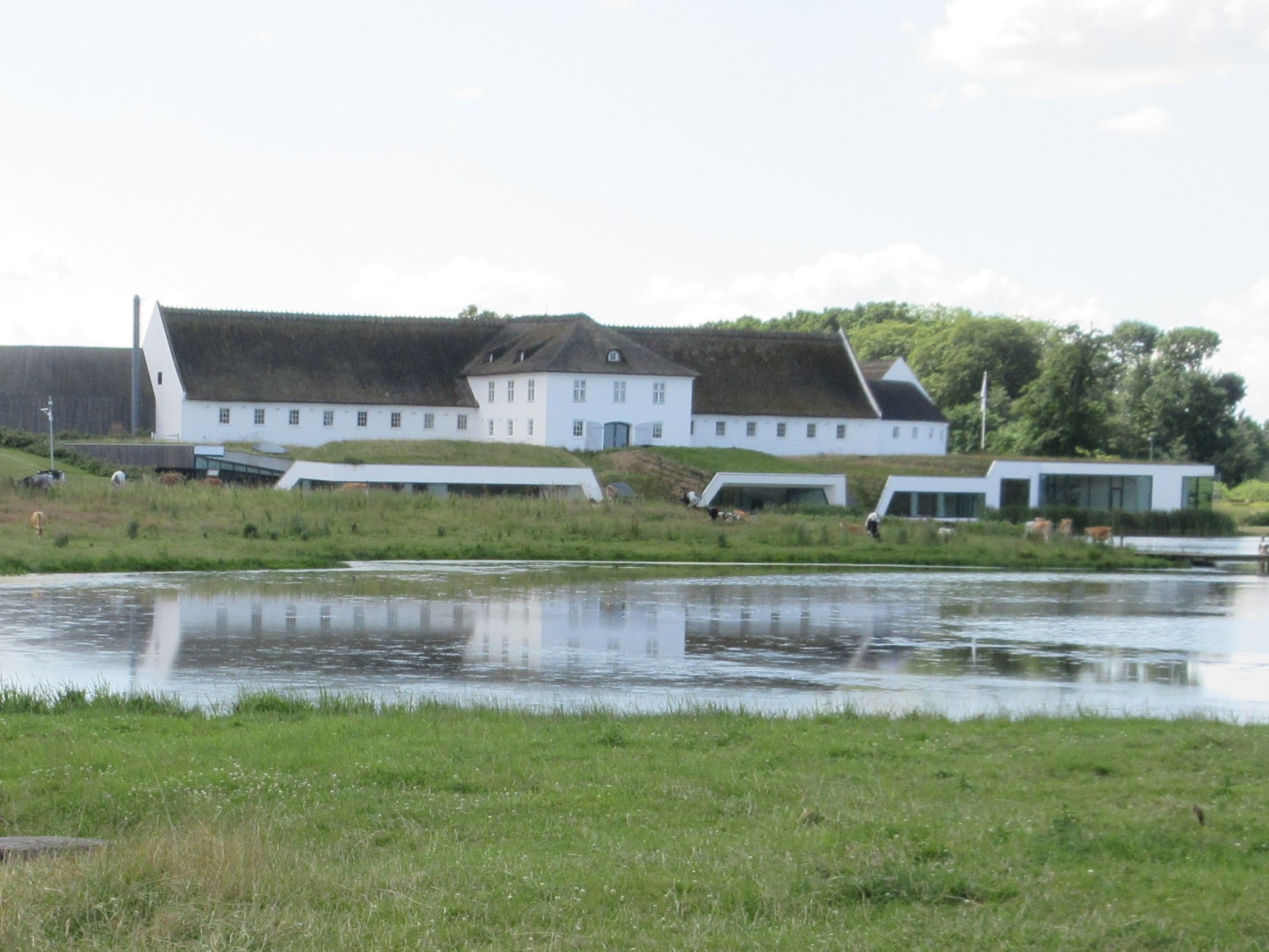
- Interactive map of the Favrholm area

General information
- Location: Roskildevej 58, 3400 Hillerød, Denmark
- Coordinates: 55°54′30.89″N 12°17′5.35″E
- Completed: 1806
- Renovated: 2004–11

Favrholm is a former manor located on the southern outskirts of Hillerød, Denmark. The building was listed in the Danish registry of protected buildings and places in 1964. It was acquired by Novo Nordisk in 1995 and converted into a corporate training and conference centre. It was expanded with the assistance of Dutch architects SeATCH in 2005–11 and is now operated under the name Favrholm Campus.

== History ==
=== Early history ===
Favrholm is first mentioned in 1375 in the Danish Census Book.

Christian II gave Favrholm to Opretter Anders von Barby, In 1554, he sold it to Peder Oxe who gave it the name Oxholm. Archeological surveys at the castle mound located a little to the north of the current buildings indicate that the old main building was a half-timbered structure surrounded by moats.

Oxe ceded Favrholm to Christian III in exchange for Holbæk Castle in 1558. The main building was then demolished and the timber used in the construction of Frederiksborg Castle. The rest of the buildings were operated as a farm (avlsgård) under Frederiksborg Castle until they were demolished in 1638.

=== Frederiksborg Stud ===
In 1720, Favrholm was in included in the Royal Frederiksborg Stud.

The current buildings were constructed in 1804-1806, The north wing was used for stabling of cattle. The southern part of the west wing was used as housing and as a milking station while the north part served as horse stable.

In 1834, land from Favrholm was combined with land from Hillerødsholm to form the farm Trollesminde.

Favrholm was once again separated from the stud farm in 1899.

=== Government-run research farm ===
Om 1917. Favrholm and Trollesminde were turned into a government-run research farms under Statens Planteavlskommision. The National Danish Research Dairy was constructed at an adjacent site in 1923. In 1878, it was decided to close the research dairy. The closure took place in 1991.

=== Hillerød Municipality and Novo Nordisk ===
Favrholm was sold to Hillerød Municipality in 1989 and the west wing was then briefly used for quartering of refugees.

In 1995, Novo Nordisk acquired Favrholm with the aim of turning it into a corporate training and conference centre. In 2005, Dutch architectural firm SeARCH won an invited competition to expand the training centre.
