= Hansen Mansion =

Building in Copenhagen, Denmark

- Hansens Palæ
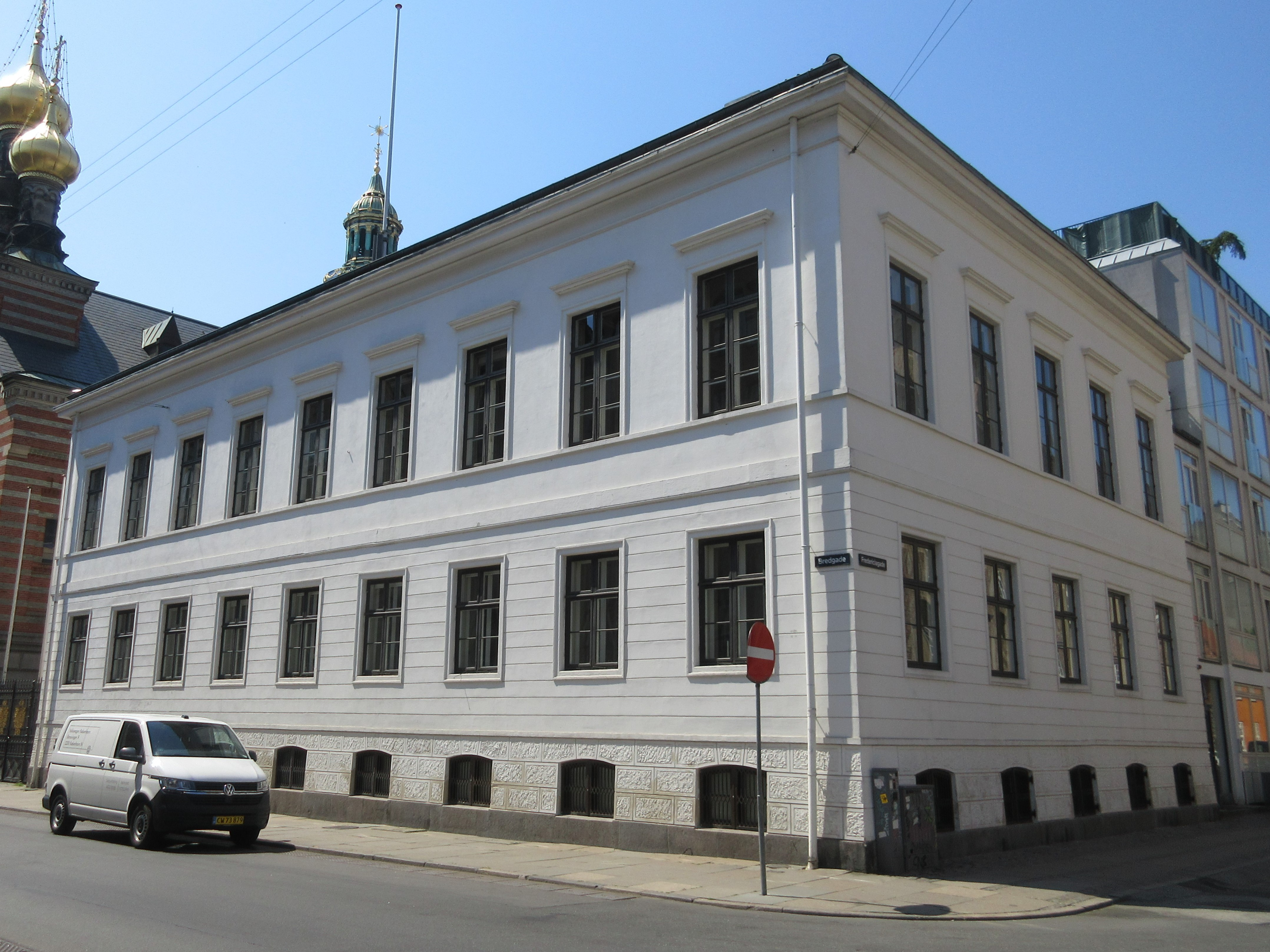
- The facade on Bredgade with the Eastern District Court seen to the far right

General information
- Architectural style: Neoclassical
- Location: Frederiksstaden, Copenhagen, Denmark
- Coordinates: 55.685583°N 12.590875°E
- Construction started: 1835
- Completed: 1836
- Client: A. N. Hansen

Design and construction
- Architect: Jørgen Hansen Koch

The (A. N.) Hansen Mansion (Danish: A. N. Hansens Palæ) is a Neoclassical town house in the Frederiksstaden neighbourhood of central Copenhagen, Denmark. Completed in 1835 to designs by Jørgen Hansen Koch, it now houses a fashion innovation centre.

== History ==
=== Site history ===
The site was formerly part of a larger property owned by the Porcelain Factory. This large property was listed in Copenhagen's new cadastre as No. 226 in St. Ann's East Quarter. The corner property was later referred to as No. 226A. It was listed in the new cadastre of 1806 as No. 281 in St. Ann's West Quarter, and belonged to distiller Jonas H. Gede at that time.

A warehouse was constructed at the site in 1806. It was later acquired by consul Peter Saabue.

=== A, N. Hansen and his house ===
In 1934, Saabye sold it to Andreas Nicolai Hansen. The present building on the site was constructed for him in 1835 with the assistance of Royal Master Builder Jørgen Hansen Koch.

In 1837, Hansen purchased the country house Kokkedal north of Copenhagen. In 1843, he replaced it with Øregård.

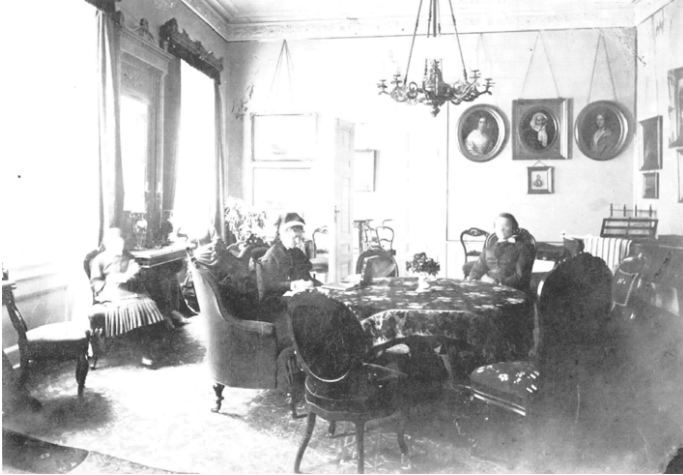
The living room in A. N. Hansen's home, c. 1870

Hansen's household consisted of 223 people at the 1840 census. They were Andreas Hansen, his wife Emma Eliza Hansen, their nine children (aged one to 13), two male servants, six maids, three children of two of the servants and 35-year-old Judithe Marie Goldschmidt.

Hansen resided in the mansion until his death in 1873. His wife died at Øregård in 1865. Their son Octavius Hansen resided on the ground floor with his family from 1870. Mary Hansen, who had become a widow in 1866, resided in the building from 1871.

=== Edmund and Alfred Hansen ===
The building was after Hansen's death in 1873 passed on to his son Edmund Hansen. In 1876, he sold the house to his elder brother Alfred Hansen. Alfred Hansen's former home at Sankt Annæ Plads 17 was taken over by his younger brother Harald Hansen.

=== Later history ===
The coffee wholesaler and dairy owner A. C. Gamél (1839–1904) lived at Fredericiagade 21 from 1895 to 1904. The insurance company Fjerde Søforsikring was later based in the building.

The architect Mogens Tøgern was appointed with refurbishing the building in 1936.

== Architecture ==
The mansion is constructed in brick with two storeys above a walk-out basement. It has a five-bays-long principal facade towards Fredericiagade and a nine-bays-long secondary facade towards Bredgade. It is designed in a strict Late Neoclassical style which was probably inspired by Karl Friedrich Schinkel's buildings in Berlin.

The building was listed as Class B in 1939.

== KICK ==
The building now houses KICK, an innovation centre for collaboration between the European and Chinese fashion industries. It was opened in May 2013 as a collaboration between Kopenhagen Fur and Danish Fashion and Textile.
