= Frederiksborg Latin School =

Latin school in Hillerød, Denmark

- Frederiksborg Latinskole
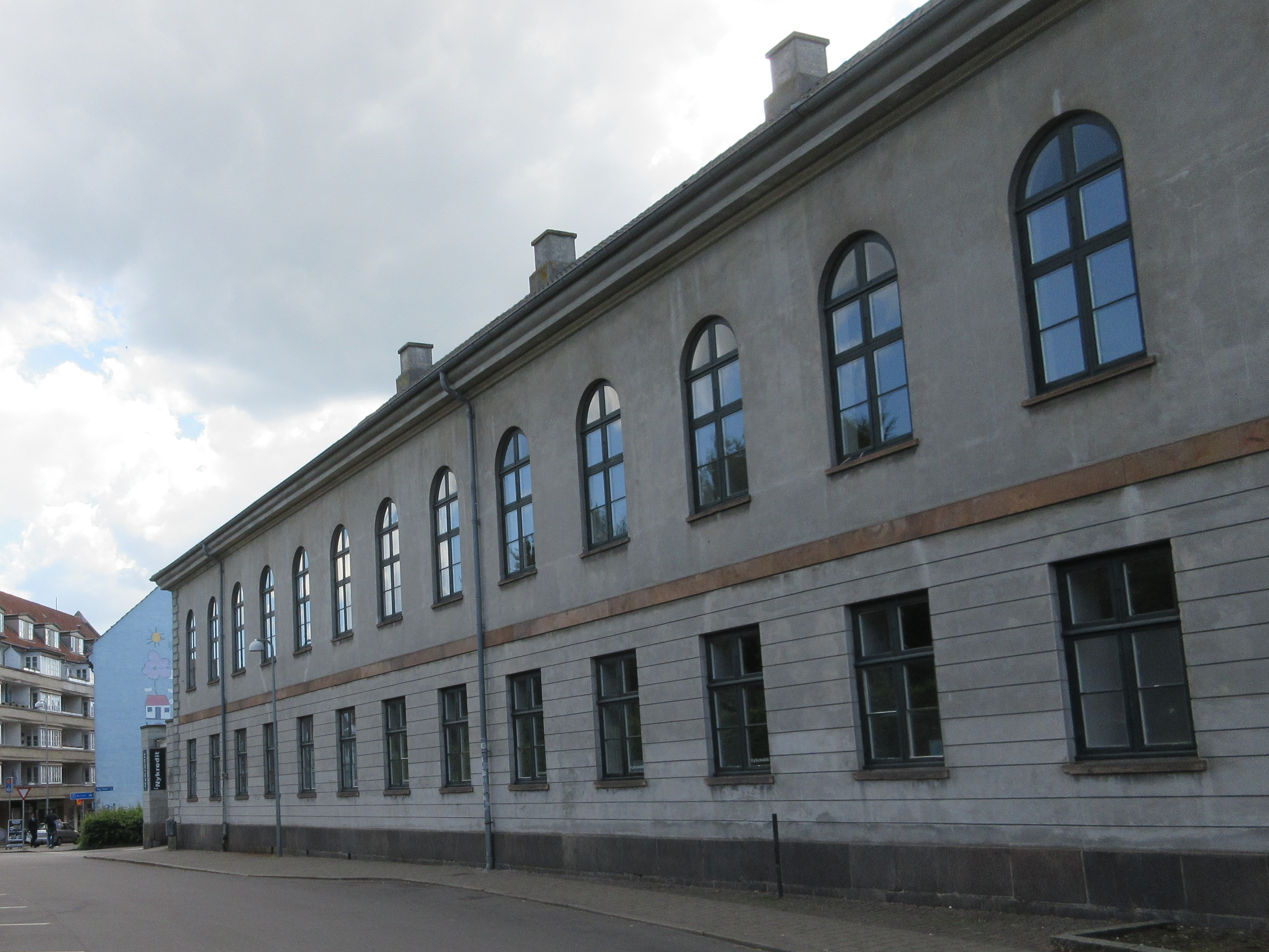
- The school seen from the street
- Interactive map of the Frederiksborg Latin School area

General information
- Architectural style: Neoclassical
- Location: Hillerød, Denmark
- Coordinates: 55°55′43.04″N 12°18′17.75″E
- Completed: 1836

Design and construction
- Architect: Jørgen Hansen Koch

Frederiksborg Latin School (Danish: Frederiksborg Latinskole) is a former latin school in Hillerød, Denmark. The school changed its name to Frederiksborg State School (Danish: Frederiksborg Statsskole) in 1903. The school moved to new premises in 1958 and is now called Frederiksborg Gymnasium. Its old building at Søndre Jernbanevej 4A was built to a Neoclassical design by Jørgen Hansen Koch in 1836. It was listed on the Danish registry of protected buildings and places in 1945.

== History ==
=== The first building ===
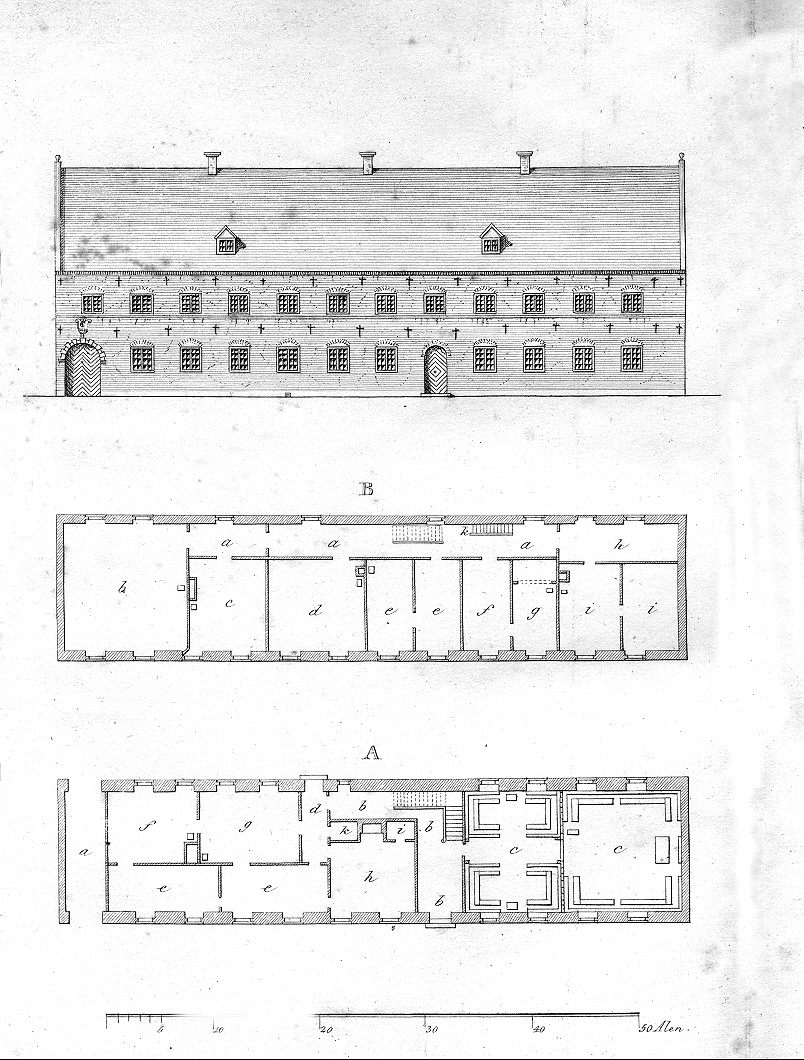
The school as it appeared from 1631 to 1706

The first latin school in Hillerød opened in 1566 but it closed again in 1586. A new school was established in connection with the completion of Frederiksborg Castle on 29 March 1630 but the school building was not completed until 1633. It was called Frederiksborg Lærde Skole.

=== The current building ===
The school was destroyed in a fire in 1834 but a new building was inaugurated in 1836. The new building was built to design by Jørgen Hansen Koch.

The school changed its name to Frederiksborg Statsskole in 1903. It was also opened to female students and boys from the working class.

=== After the move ===
The building in Søndre Jernbanegade was decommissioned when the school moved to new premises in 1858. The owner of the old building went bankrupt in May 2015. It was sold to a new owner in 2017.

== Today ==
Today, the building is rented out to tenants.

== Students ==
- Oluf Lundt Bang, lawyer

' Peter Georg Bang, politician
