= Jørgen Hansen Koch =

Danish architect (1787–1860)

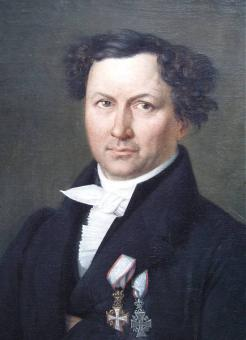
- Born: 4 September 1787; Copenhagen, Denmark
- Died: 30 January 1860 (aged 72); Copenhagen, Denmark
- Occupation: Architect
- Buildings: Sæby Church

Jørgen Hansen Koch (4 September 1787 – 30 January 1860) was a Neoclassical Danish architect. He was chief of the national Danish building administration from 1835 and director of the Royal Danish Academy of Fine Arts from 1844 to 1849.

Koch and especially his wife Ida Koch were close friends of the writer Hans Christian Andersen, who would typically visit the Koch family on Friday evenings.

== Early life and education ==
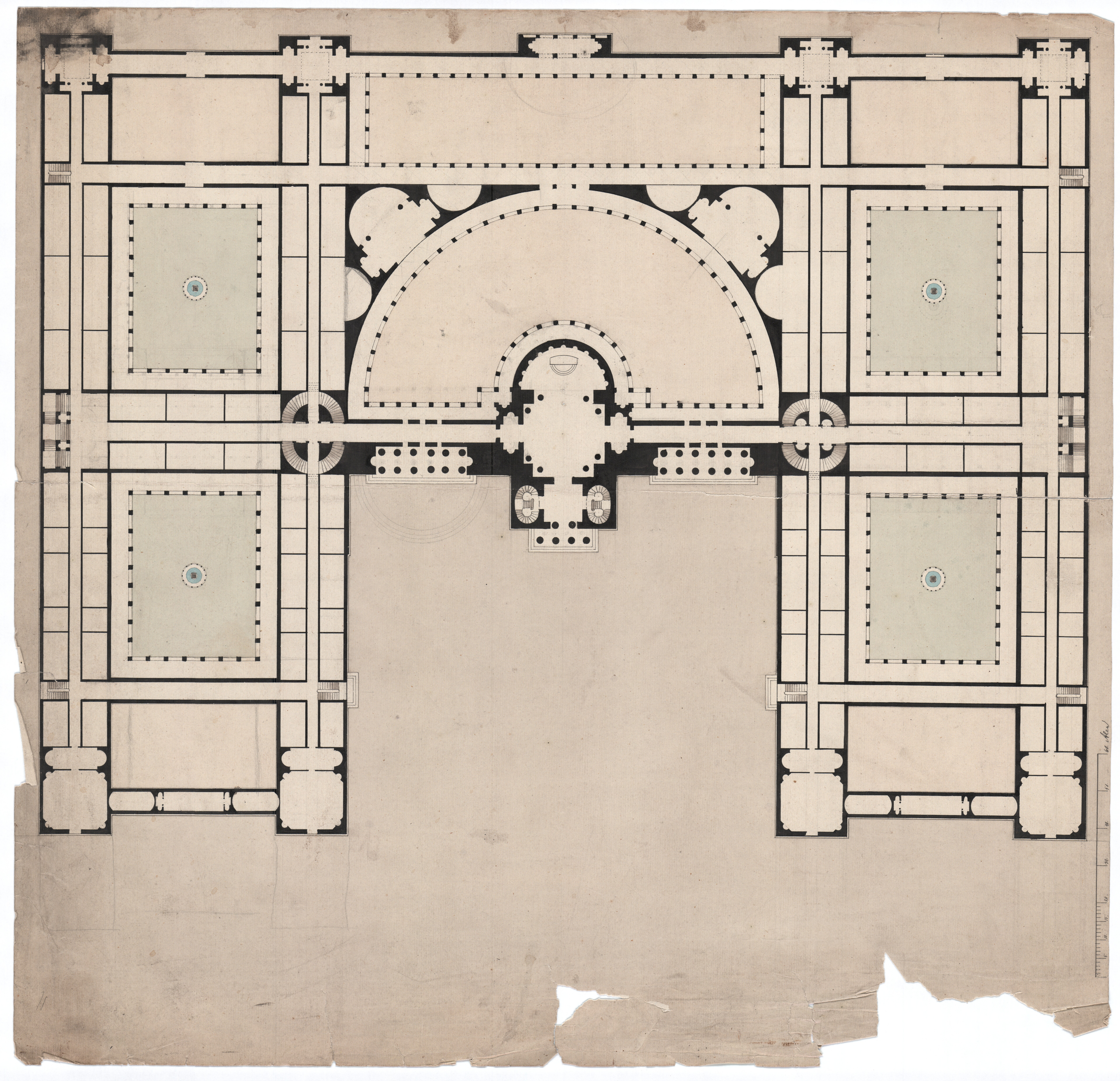
Hansen's proposal for a military hospital for which he was awarded the Academy's large gold medal in 116,

Koch was born on 4 September 1787 in Christianshavn, Copenhagen, the son of Jørgen Hansen Koch (1746–1801), a ship builder, and Anne Cathrine née Folkersen (1758–1809). He initially apprenticed as a carpenter. He attended the Royal Danish Academy of Fine Arts from 1807 to 1816 where he studied under Christian Frederik Hansen, the leading Danish architect of the time. He won the Academy small gold medal in 1811 for the project "An Art Academy" and its large gold medal in 1816 for the project "A military hospital for a garrison with large regiments". He was subsequently promised the Academy's large travel stipend with effect from 1 January 1819. Yogether with the sculptor Hermann Ernst Freund, he traveled to Rome where he met Bertel Thorvaldsen and other members of the Danish artists' colony who resided in the city at that time. Freund became Thorvaldsen's assistant while Koch later continued to Greece, making him the first Danish architect educated at the Academy to visit the cradle of the Classical architecture which was the period's main source of inspiration for architects. He also visited Constantinople before returning to Italy. In 1822 he returned to Denmark by way of France and London.

== Career ==
Back in Denmark, Koch was appointed Royal Master Builder, succeeding Christian Frederik Hansen as the leader of the national building administration. From 1835 he also held a professorial chair at the Royal Academy and between 1844 and 1849 served as its director.

In 1837 he became part of the Committee for the Foundation of Thorvaldsen's Museum.

Koch was responsible for a number of renovations and reconstructions of Royal residences, including Brockdorff's Palace (1827–1828) and Bernstorff's Mansion (1829). He also designed a number of schools, including Frederiksborg Latin School and Roskilde Cathedral School (1842).

In Copenhagen, he designed the Hansen Mansion (1835) in Frederiksstaden.

== Family and Hans Christian Andersen link ==
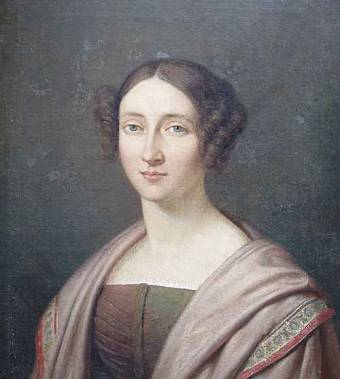
Ida Koch, née Wulff, painted by J. L. Lund (1831)

Jørgen Koch was married to Ida Koch née Wulff, daughter of counter admiral Peter Frederik Wulff (1774–1848) and Hanne Henriette Weinholt (1784–1836). The couple had three sons: Jørgen Hansen Koch (1829–1919), a head teacher, Peter Frederik Koch (1832–1907), a Justitiarius, and Hans Henrik Koch (1836–1903), a naval officer who reached the rank of vice admiral.

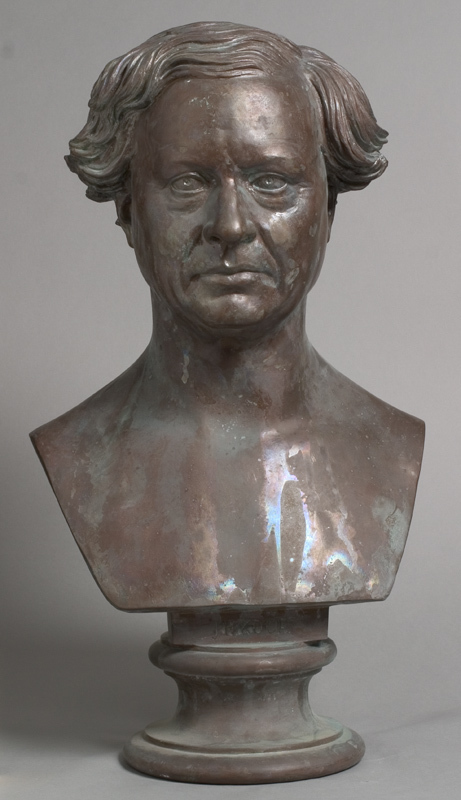
Bust by H. W. Bissen, 1835

Jørgen and Ida Koch belonged to Hans Christian Andersen's social circle. Andersen had an open invitation to visit the family for dinner on Fridays. Andersen also developed a friendly relationship with their children which continued after the parents' death, as did the dinner arrangement on Fridays. Andersen also knew other members of the Koch and Wulff families.

Herman Wilhelm Bissen created a portrait bust of him in 1835.

Jørgen Hansen Koch died on 30 January 1860 in Copenhagen and is buried in the city's Vestre Cemetery.

== Selected works ==
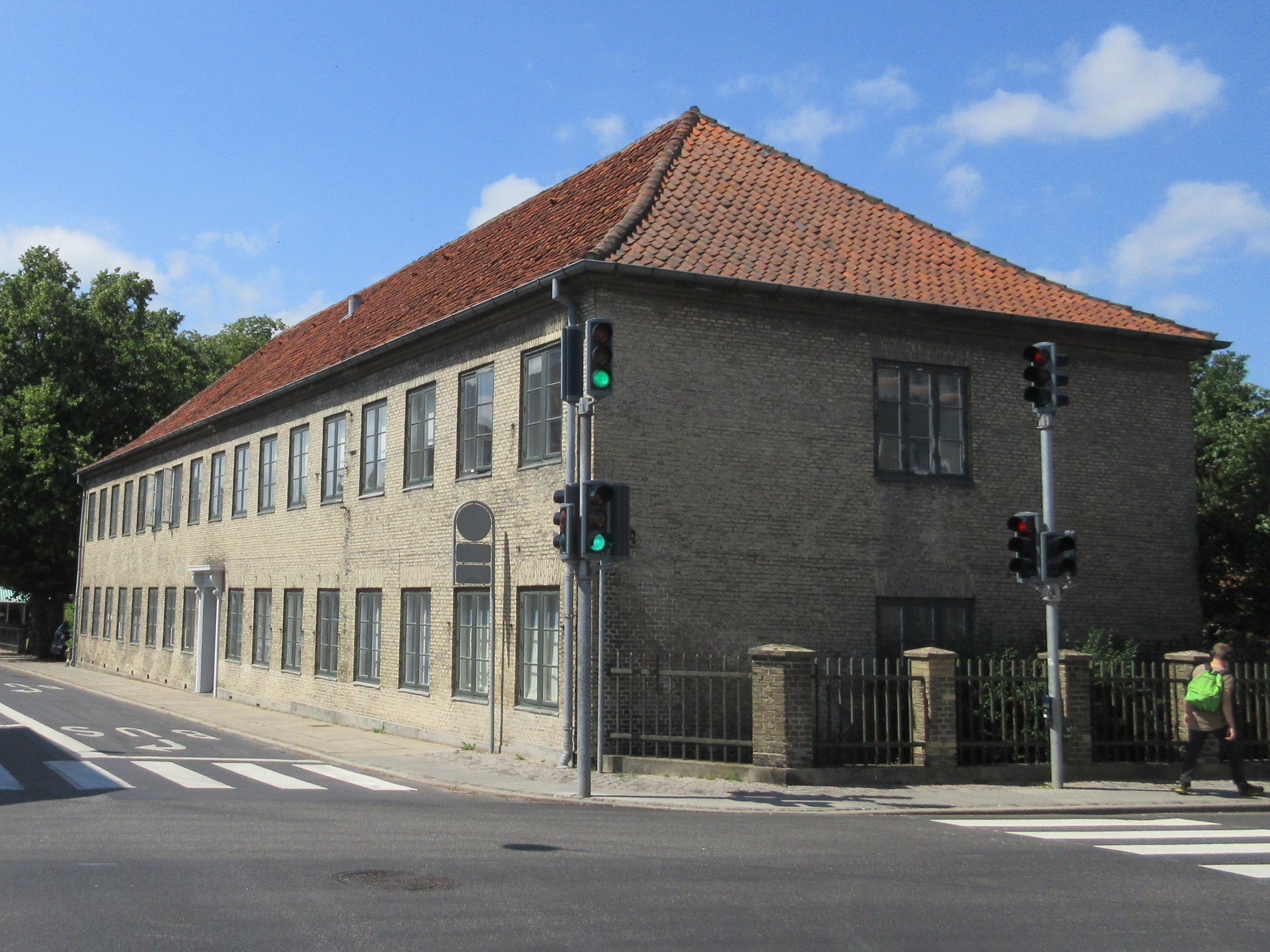
Duebrødre Kloster

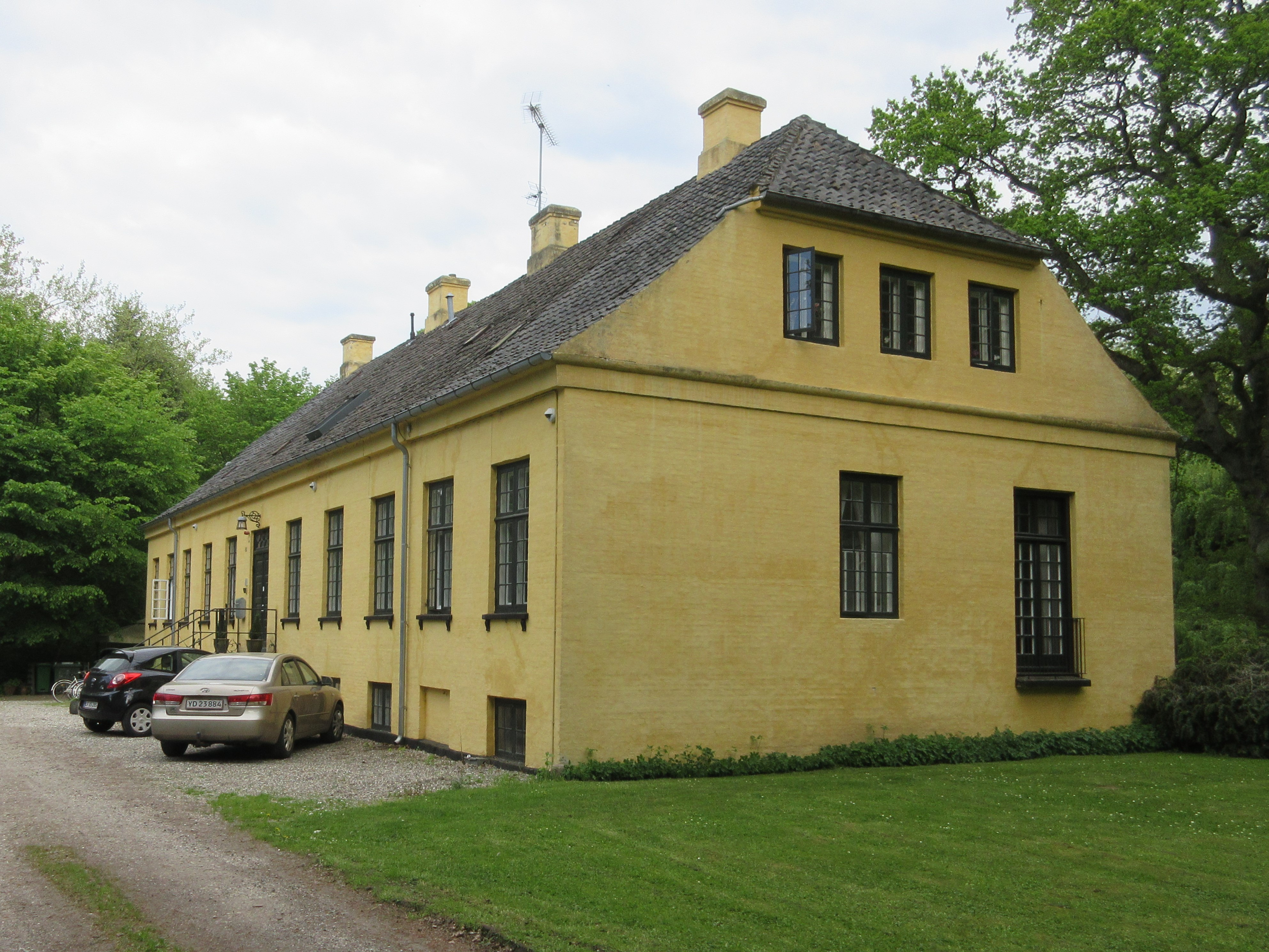
Hegnetslund

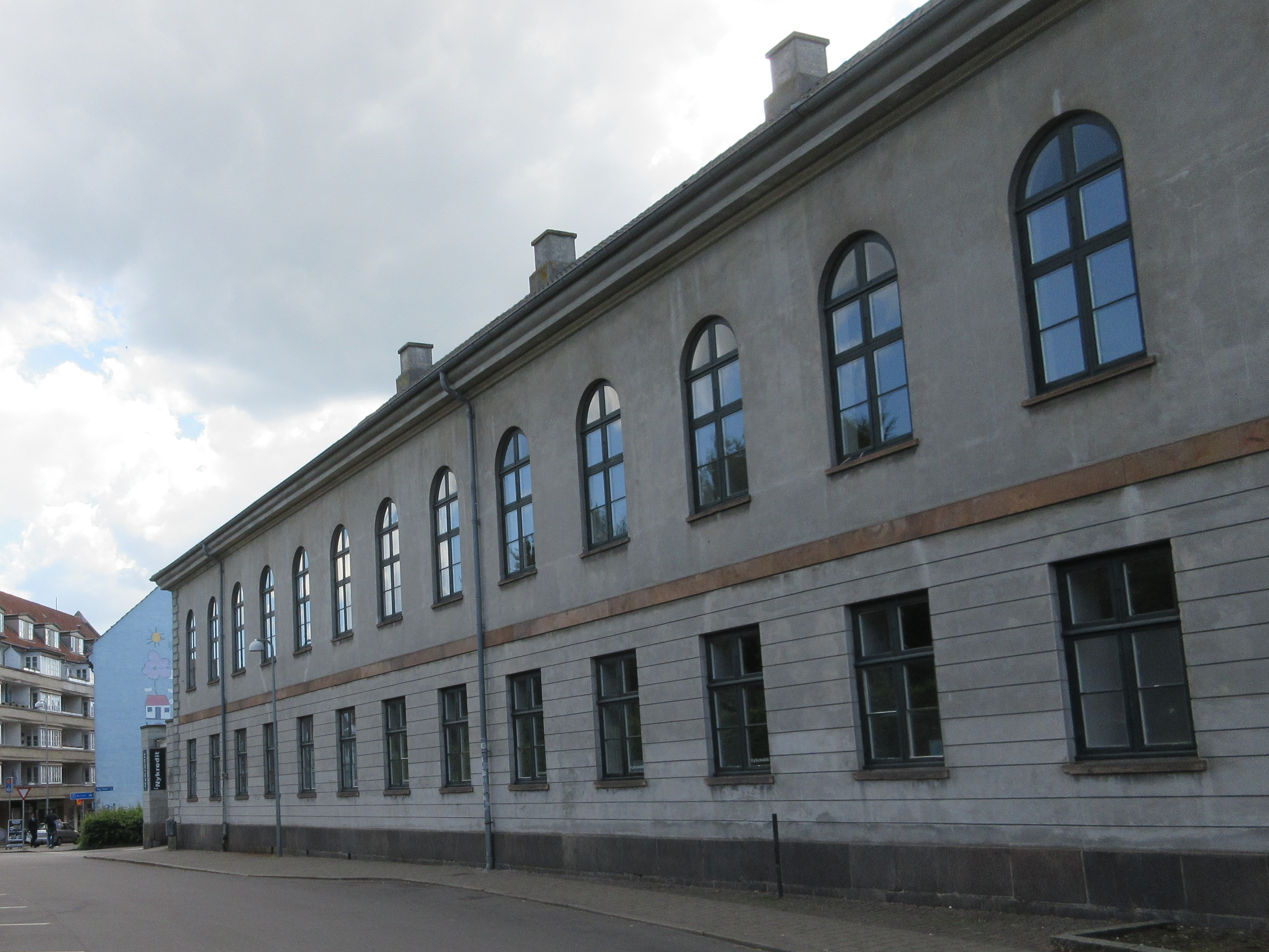
Frederiksborg Latin School

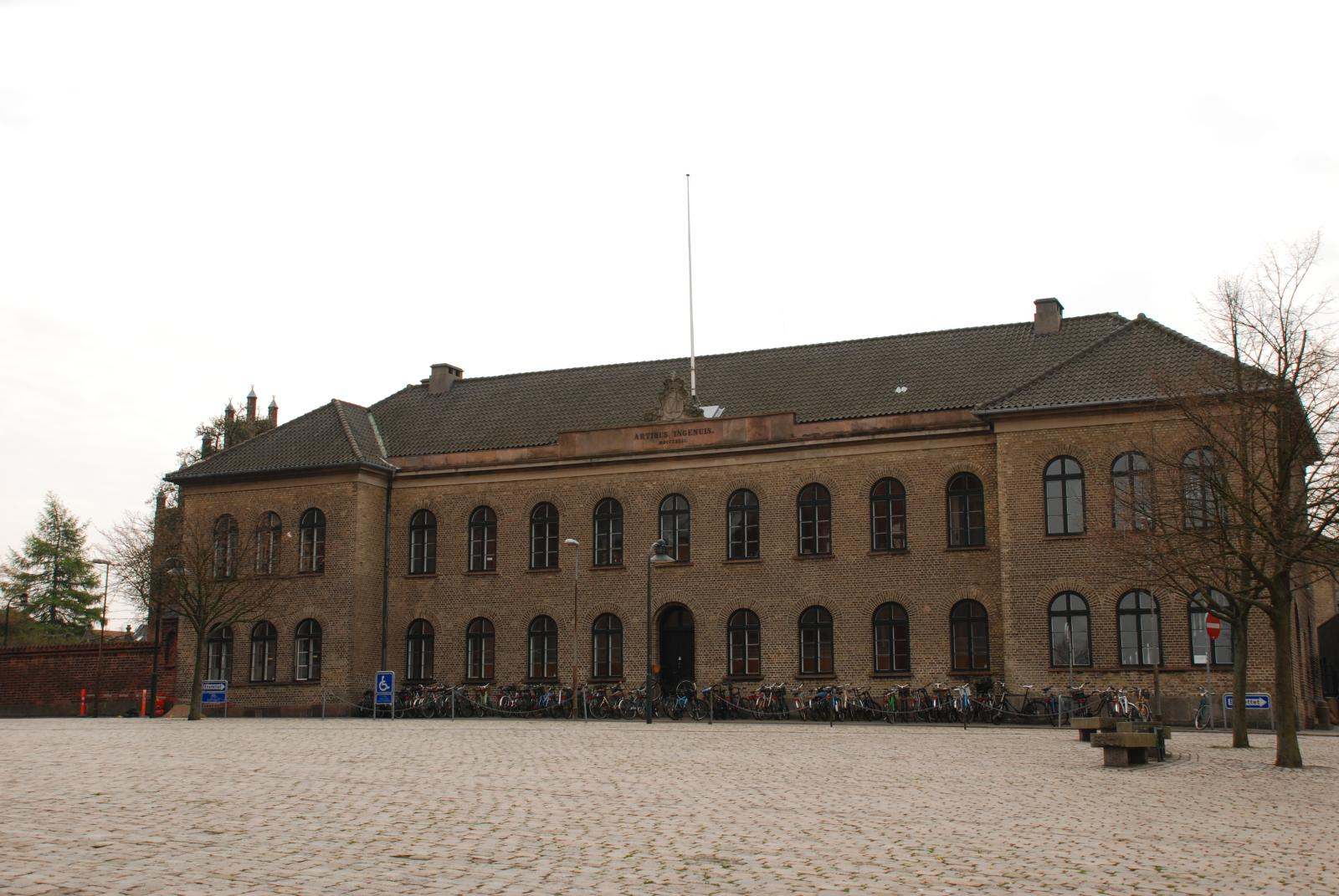
Roskilde Cathedral School (now Roskilde Gymnasium)

- Middelfart Town Hall, Middelfart (1823–1826, listed)
- Duebrødre Kloster, Roskilde, Denmark (1841)
- Svendborg Town Hall, Svendborg (1825)
- Hegnetslund, Herfølge (1825)
- Rolighed, Vedbæk (1825)
- Meyers Minde, Krystalgade 12, Copenhagen (1826)
- Borgerskole, Svendborg (1830–1831, demolished)
- Skuldelev Rectory, Skuldelev (1830)
- Quarantine station, Kyholm (1831, demolished in 1859)
- Klitfogedbolig, Skagen (1831–1832)
- Rosenborg Brøndanstalt, Gothersgade 64, Copenhagen (1833, demolished in 1928)
- Frederiksborg Latin School, Sdr. Jernbanevej 4, Hillerød (1834, extension by Ferdinand Meldahl in 1882–1885, listed)
- Hansen Mansion, Fredericiagade 21, Copenhagen (1835, extension by Aage Nielsen in 1957)
- Store Heddinge Town Hall, Store Heddinge (1838, later expanded)
- Gardener's House, Sorgenfri Palace (1840)
- Volkersen House, Jagtvej, Copenhagen (1841, demolished)
- Avlsbygninger, Bregentved (1841, demolished)
- Kærup Manor, Benløse (1841–1842)
- Roskilde Cathedral School, Roskilde (1842, adapted in 1980, listed)
- Helsingør Customs House, Helsingør (1844, demolished in 1889)
- Rudkøbing Town Hall, Rudkøbing (1845)
- Ringsted Town Hall, Ringsted (1845)
- Odense Cathedral School, Odense (1845–1846)
- Reykjavík Latin School, Reykjavík (1845)
- Farmhouse, Iceland
- Own house, stable and carriagehouse, Ny Kongensgade 15, Copenhagen (1847, demolished)
- Farmhouse, Vallø Castle (1852)
- Farmhouse, Vallø (1854)
- Voldbro, Vallø Castle (1856)

=== Extensions, adaptions and refurbishments ===
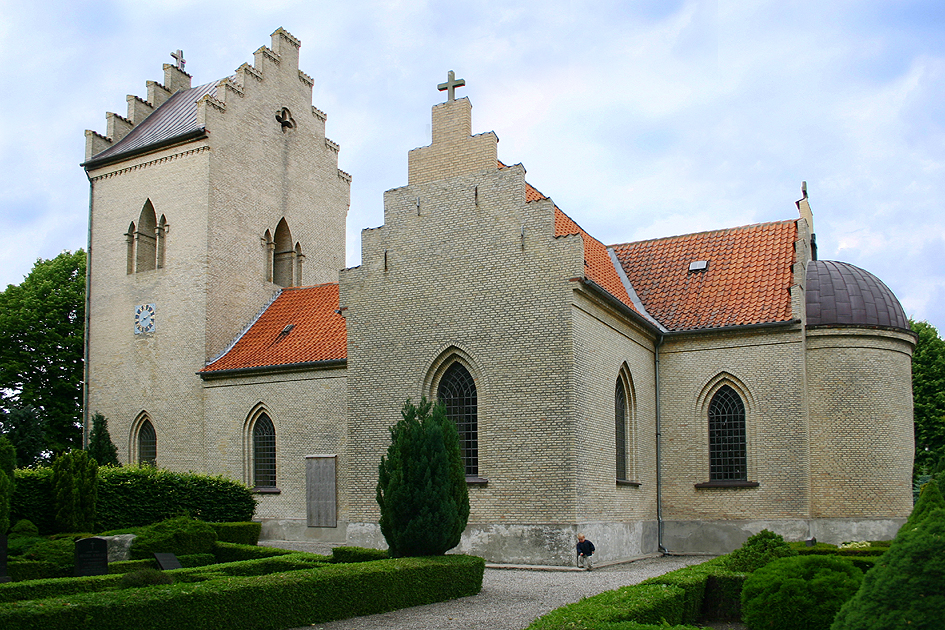
Sæby Church

- Royal Danish Academy of Surgery, Bredgade 62, Copenhagen (1823)
- Sæby Church, Sæby, Hornsherred (1823)
- Lindegården, Hornsherred (1827, demolished)
- Extension of Royal Danish Library, Copenhagen (1827, 20 columns and other elements now in Museet på Koldinghus)
- Holstein Mansion, Stormgade 10, Copenhagen (1827)
- Fasangården, Frederiksberg Park (1828)
- Amalienborg, Brockdorff's Palace, Copenhagen (1827–1828)
- Moltke Mansion, proposed change
- Bernstorff's Mansion, Bredgade 42, Copenhagen (1829)
- Charlottenlund Palace, Copenhagen
- Frederiksberg Palace, Copenhagen (1828)
- Gatehouse at Frederiksborg Palace, construction of gate building (1829)
- Justo, Frederiksberg Park, Frederiksberg (1834, extended and altered by Christian Klingsey 1900)
- Stændersal, Viborg (1834)
- Stændersal, Roskilde (1835, Yellow Mansion)
- Cantor's House, Vallø (1836)
- Royal Danish Theatre, Copenhagen (1837, demolished in 1874)
- Elers Kollegium, Store Kannikestræde 9, Copenhagen (1837)
- Kiel Palace (1838, demolished after WW2 bombing)
- Odense Slot, southeast wing (1837), garden, smst. (1840) and interior, smst. (1841)
- Frederiksgave, Assens, Denmark (1841)
- Court Theatre, Christiansborg Ridehus, Copenhagen (1842)
- Gottorp Castle (1842)
- Yellow Mansion, Amaliegade 18, Copenhagen (1842)
- Bernstorff Palace, Jægersborg Allé (1844)
- Aarhus Cathedral School, Skolegyde, Aarhus (1847–1849, expanded by Hack Kampmann 1904, C.F. Møller 1957)
- Slagelse Hospital, south wing, Slagelse (1848)
- Ladegården, new wing, Frederiksberg (1848, demolished 1930)
- Frederiksborg Castle, Badstuen, along with barracks and stables (1849)
- Prince's Mansion, Copenhagen (1849, now Nationalmuseet)
- Børsen, Copenhagen

=== Unrealized projects ===
- Theater and yard (1824)
- Hellerupgård, veranda (1825)
- Warehouse (1827)
- Manor and stable (1829)
- City hall (awarded, 1833)
- Thorvaldsen's Museum (1839, competition submission)
- More designs for pavilions (1842 and undated)
- Main building (1850)
- Designs for prisons and jails (1840)
- Furniture; royal sarcophagus (1850)

=== Other works ===
- Decoration for Adam Wilhelm Moltke's wedding (1823)
- Living room at Bregentved (1824)

=== Burial monuments ===
- Tombstone for gehejmestatsminister Niels Rosenkrantz, Rye Kirke (1824)
- Tombstone for Minna von Witzleben, Vemmetofte (1849)
- Sarcophagus for doctor Heinrich Callisen, St. Peter's Church (1824)
- Sarcophagus for landgrave Wilhelm, Landgrave of Hesse-Philippsthal-Barchfeld (1834)
- Sarcophagus for Christian VIII (1848, Roskilde Domkirke)

=== Written works ===
- Hvilke Fordringer burde der vel især gjøres til en Bygmester i Danmark, Kunstforeningen, Copenhagen 1834.

== See also ==
- List of Danish architects
- Architecture of Denmark

Cultural offices
Preceded by Bertel Thorvaldsen	Director of the Royal Danish Academy of Fine Arts; 1844–1849	Succeeded by Herman Wilhelm Bissen
