= Batzke's House =

House in Hillerød Municipality, Denmark

Coordinates: 55°56′9.99″N 12°18′26.27″E

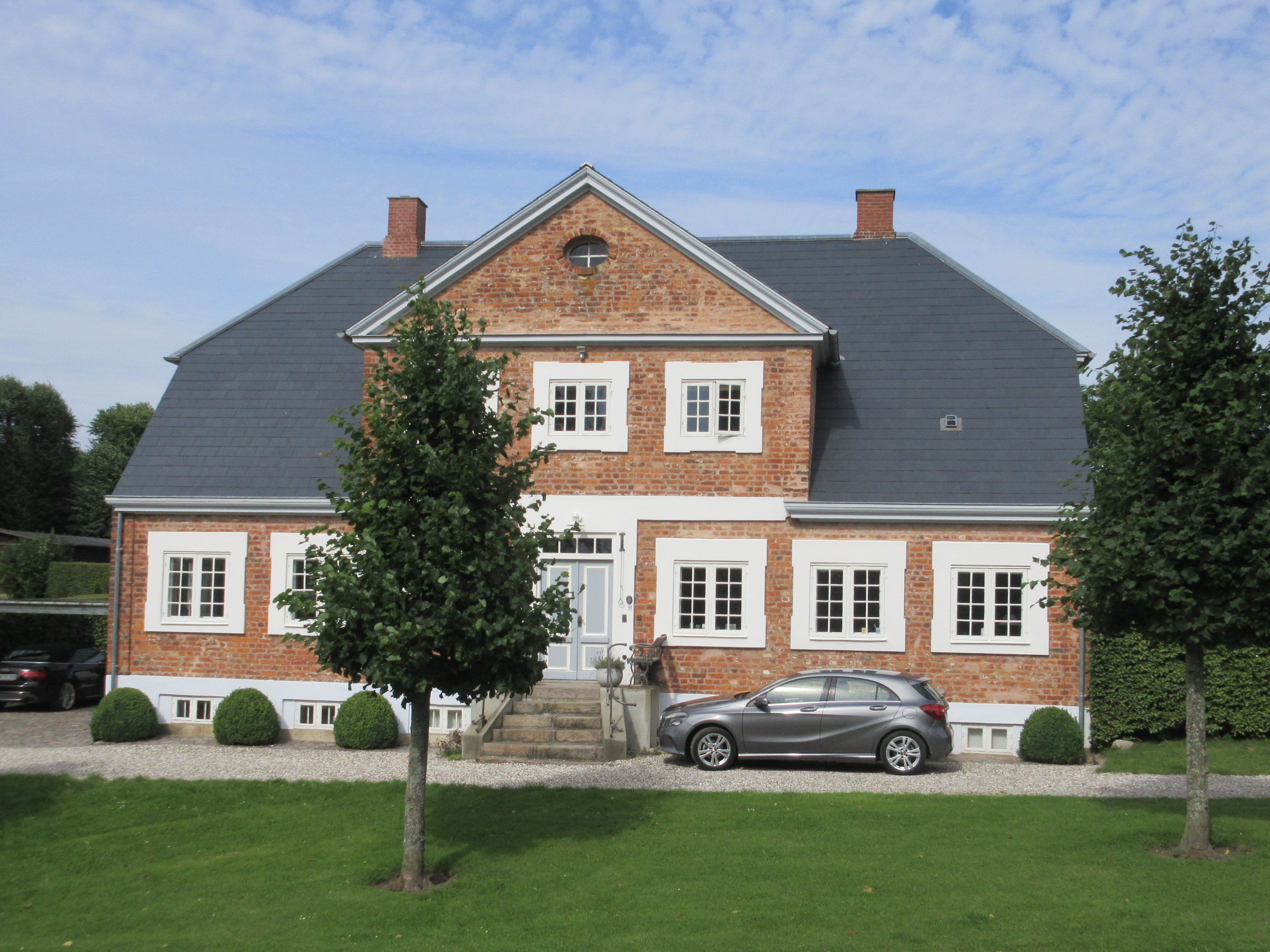
Batzke's House

Batzke's House (Danish: Batzkes Hus) is the former gardener's house at Frederiksborg Castle in Hillerød, Denmark. It was built on a hilltop near the castle in 1720 to a design by Johan Cornelius Krieger. It was listed in 1924.
