= Johan Cornelius Krieger (architect) =

Danish architect and landscape architect

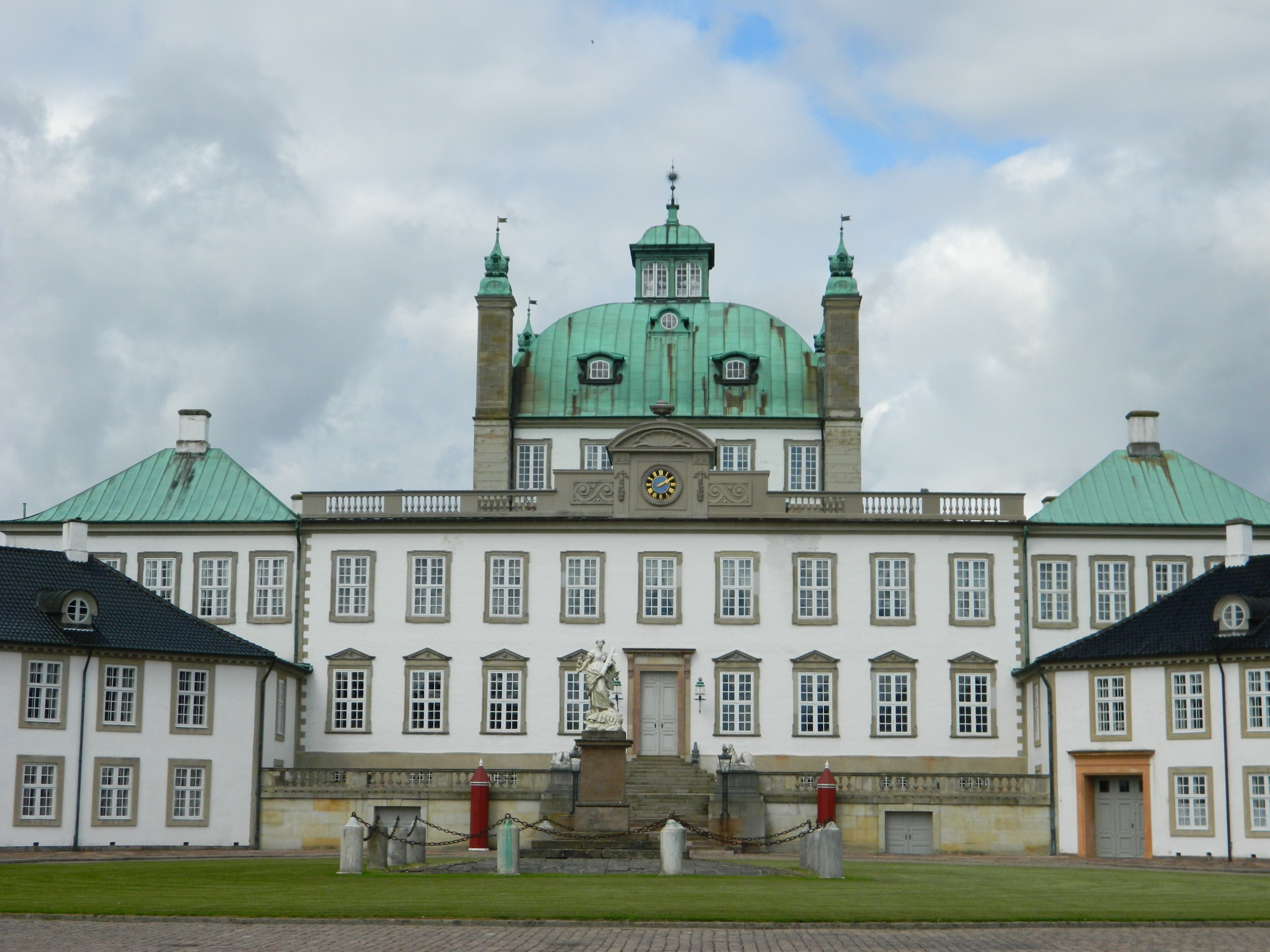
Fredensborg Palace

Johan Cornelius Krieger (1683–1755) was a Danish architect and landscape architect, who from the 1720s served as both the country's chief architect, and head of the royal gardens.

Krieger oversaw the construction of Fredensborg Palace and its gardens, as well as an expansion of Frydenlund Manor. He also designed or redeveloped the gardens of Frederiksberg Palace (now Frederiksberg Park), Clausholm Castle, Rosenborg Castle, Hirschholm Palace, and Odense Palace. Following the Copenhagen Fire of 1728, he was involved in the plan to reconstruct the city using brick-faced houses, establishing by March 1729 a brick works and, in partnership with Vice Admiral Ulrich Kaas, a lime kiln and a sawmill in Christianshavn He was an exponent of the baroque architecture and was influenced by the French formal garden style of André Le Nôtre.

== Personal life ==
On 8 March 1712, he married Anna Matthisen (1692–1760). He died on 21 September 1755 in Copenhagen.

== Selected buildings ==
- Batzke's House, Hillerød, Denmark (1720)
- Fredensborg Palace, Fredensborg, Denmark (1720s)
- Lindholm, Lejre Municipality (c. 1730)
