= Marienborg =

Official residence of the Danish prime minister

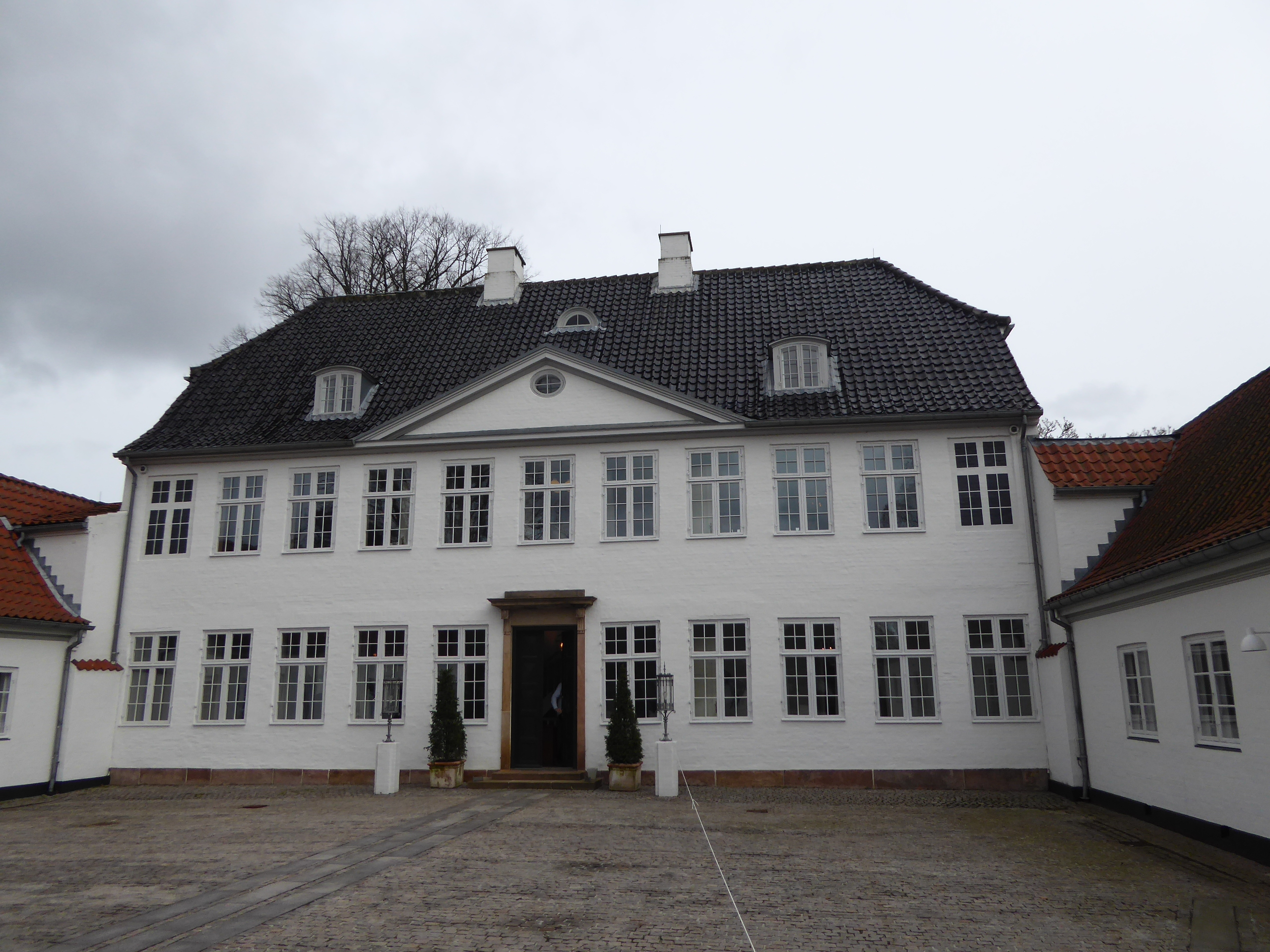
- Interactive map of the Marienborg area

General information
- Architectural style: Neoclassical
- Location: Lyngby-Taarbæk Municipality, Denmark
- Coordinates: 55°46′32″N 12°27′53″E
- Completed: c. 1745

Marienborg, a mid 18th-century country house perched on a small hilltop on the northern shore of Bagsværd Lake, Lyngby-Taarbæk Municipality, 15 kilometres (9.3 mi) north of downtown Copenhagen, has served as the official residence of Denmark's prime minister since 1962. It is frequently used for governmental conferences, summits and other official purposes, including the prime minister's new year speech. Unlike the residences of many other heads of government and state (e.g. the White House, 10 Downing Street, La Moncloa and Élysée Palace), Marienborg does not serve as the government headquarters or contain the office of the prime minister. The Prime Minister's Office is instead located in Christiansborg on Slotsholmen in downtown Copenhagen. Marienborg was listed on the Danish registry of protected buildings and places in 1964.

== History ==
=== 18th century ===
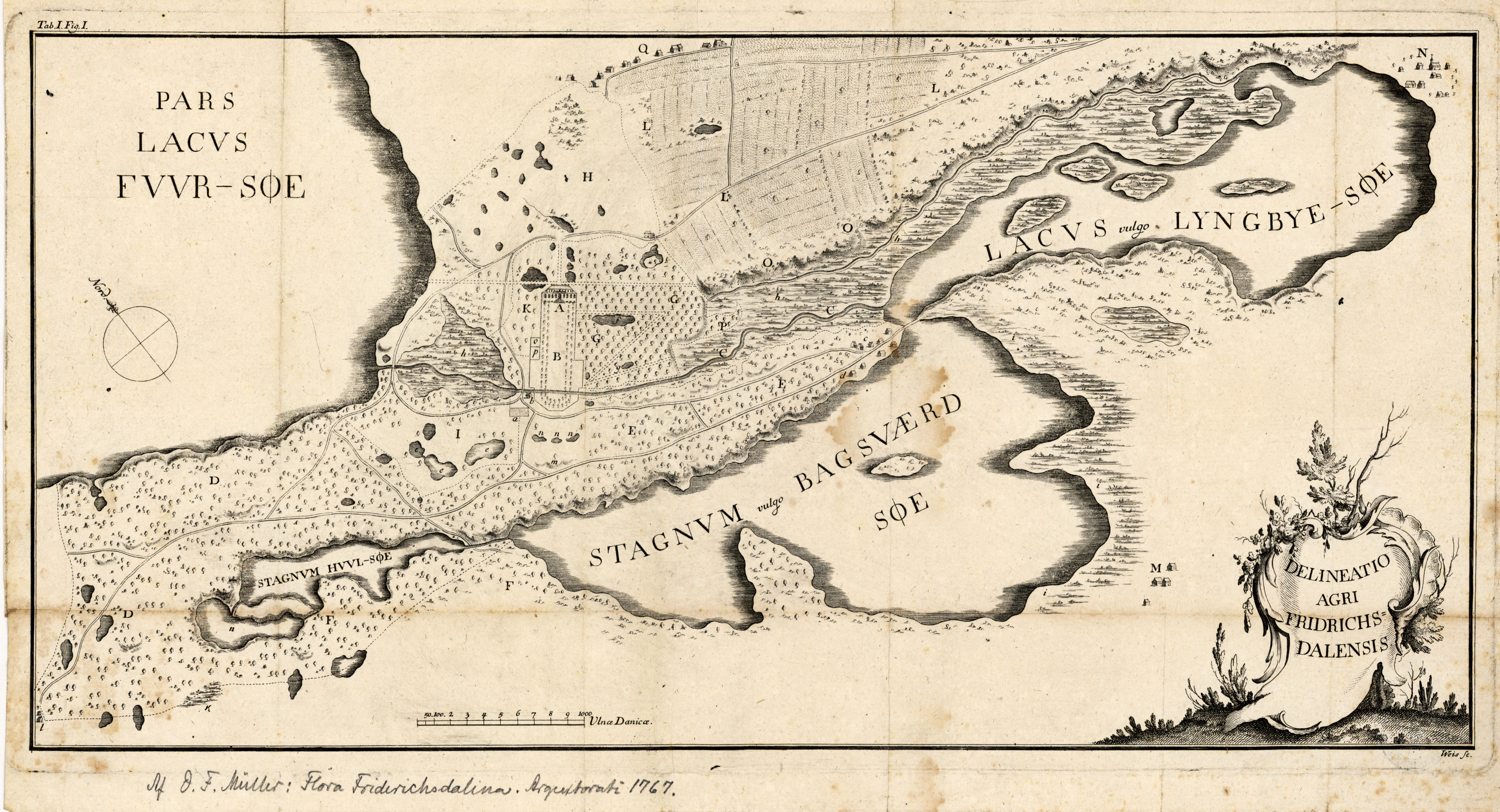
Ny Frederiksdal - seen as a cluster of unnamed houses - on a map from 1767

In the 18th century, the region north of Copenhagen became popular for its scenic views and opportunities for recreation with the surrounding meadows, woods and lakes, with many summer residences being built. Marienborg is one of several properties which were sold off from the Frederiksdal estate from the middle of the 18th century and used for the construction of country houses. They were collectively referred to as Ny Frederiksdal (New Frederiksdal) and also comprised Søro, Tusculum, Sophienholm and Christianelyst. The main building was constructed in around 1745 for the naval officer and director of the Danish Asiatic Company Olfert Fas Fischer. He was the father of the much more famous naval hero Olfert Fischer.

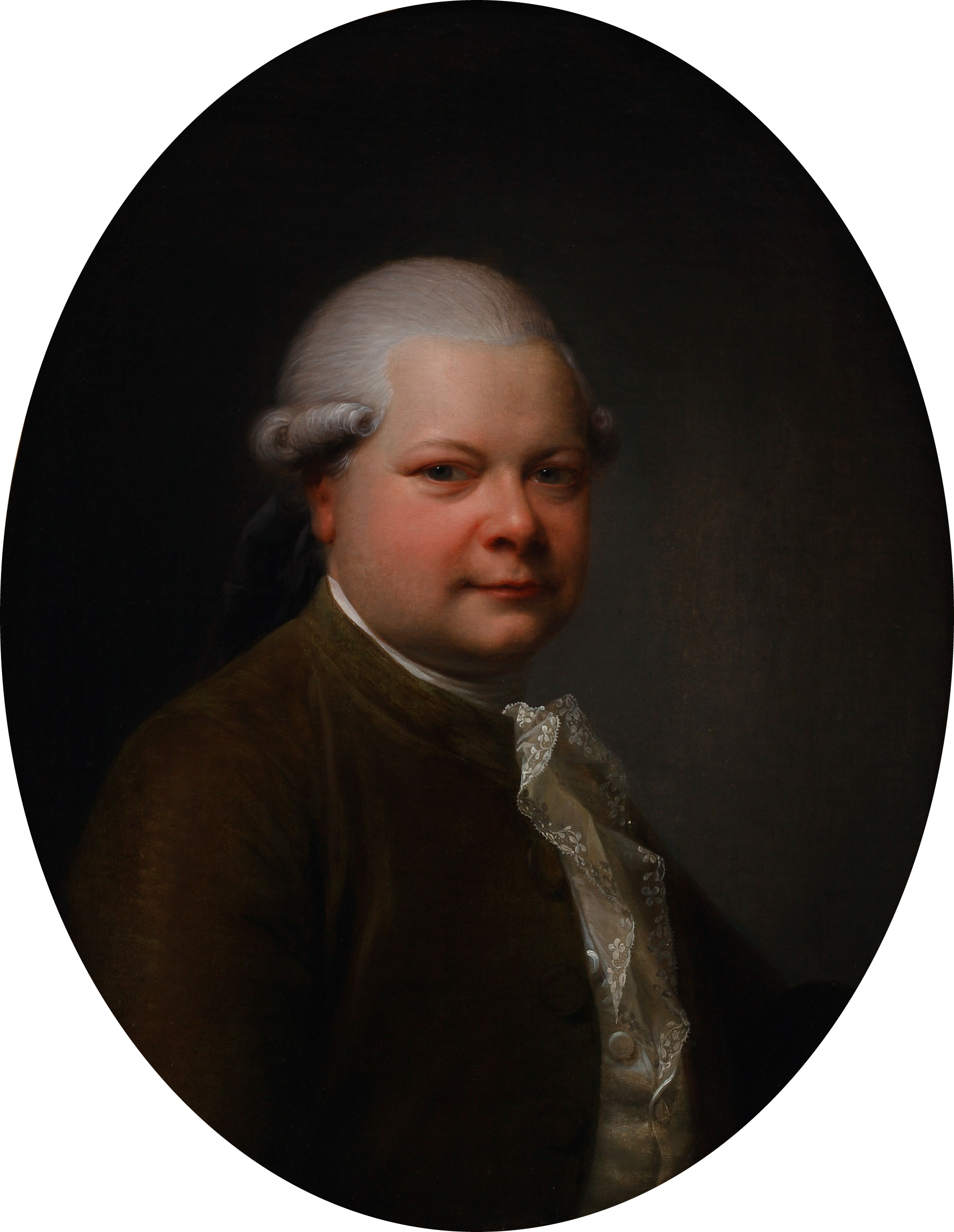
Johan Frederik Lindencrone

In 1750, Fischer sold the estate to Peter de Windt. Windt's widow, Maria Cathrine Michaelsdatter Fabritius, a daughter of the wealthy merchant Michael Fabritius, sold the estate to Jacob Frederik Schaffalitzky de Muckadell a few years after his death.

The next owner Gysbert Behagen, from 1764 to 1792, was a wealthy merchant, ship-owner and director of the Danish Asiatic Company. His city home was the Behagen House in Christianshavn.

Behagen was succeeded by Werner Hans Rudolph Rosenkrantz Giedde, a chamberlain and enthusiastic amateur flutist and composer. He was a member of a commission tasked with reorganizing the Royal Danish Orchestra and from 1791 to 1793 served as its administrative leader.

The estate was in 1795 acquired by Johan Frederik Lindencrone, the owner of the Lindencrone Mansion in Copenhagen as well as Gjorslev Manor on Stevns, who named it Marienborg after his wife Marie.

=== 19th century ===
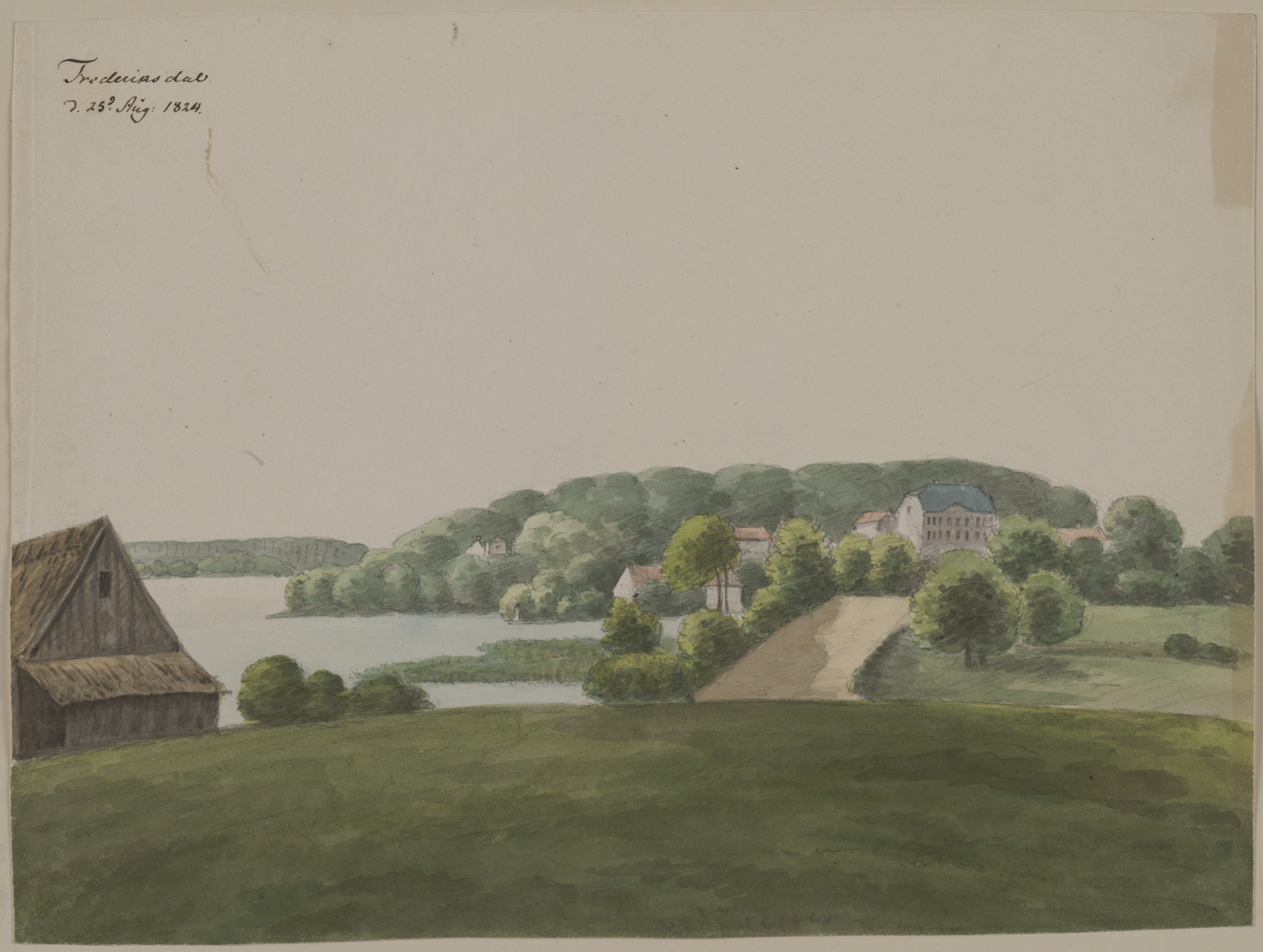
Ny y Frederiksdal with Marienborg and Tusculumseen on a drawing by Ole Jørgen Rawert from 25 August 1824.

In 1800, Lindencrone had to sell Marienborg due to economic difficulties. The buyer, Johann Traugott Lebrecht Otto (1766–1824), had served as garrison surgeon on Saint Thomas in the Danish West Indies. In 1801, he sold the estate to Julius Ludvig Frederik Rantzau and Johan de Windt.

In 1803, Marienborg changed hands again when it was acquired by Jean de Coninck (1744–1807). He was the brother of Frédéric de Coninck, owner of the nearby Dronninggård estate. In 1806, in partnership with his brother, Charles August Selby and William Duntzfelt. Coninck had purchased the Royal Danish Silk Manufactury in Bredgade.

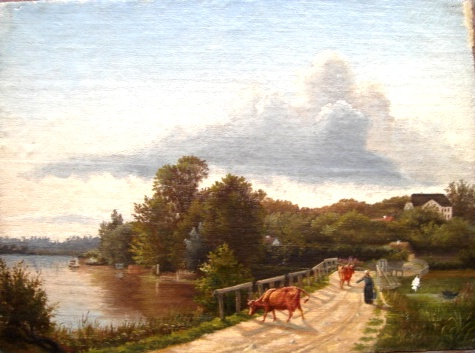
Nybrovej with Marienborg visible in the background 1876

Peter Boll Wivet (1760–1824), a Supreme Court attorney, purchased Marienborg in 1809. Wivet's winter residence was at Gothersgade 15. Hiswidow, Catharina Sophie Wivet (née Ernst) resided at Marienborg until her death in 1849. Their daughter and only child, Cecilie (1802–1874), sold the estate to Edvard Knudsen.

In 1855, Marienborg changed hands again. The new owner, Vilhelm Junius Lorentz Petersen, was the owner of Lorentz Petersen, a wine business with roots dating back to 1788.

On Lorentz Petersen's death in 1863, Marienborg was sold to Rosalie Moltke (née Hennings), whose husband, Adam Gottlob Moltke of Espe and Bonderup, had also just died. On her death, Marienborg remained in the hands of the Moltke family for the next 15 years.

=== 1900–1960 ===
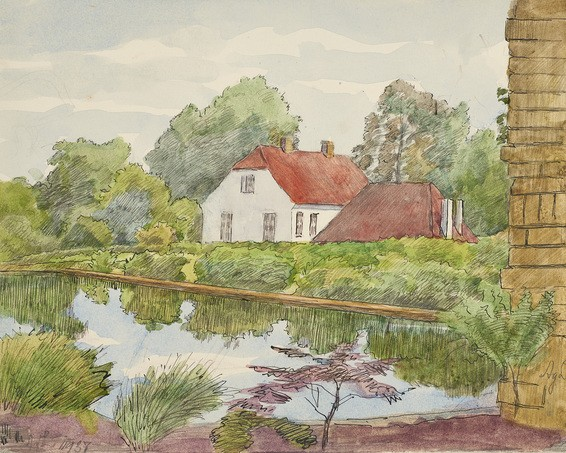
Agnes Lunn: From Marienborg (1937). The artist, a cousin of David's mother, was his god mother

Oscar Wandel, owner of Carl Wandel & Søn, a wine company, purchased Marienborg in 1899. In 1915, he sold the estate to Vilhelm Skovgaard-Petersen,

In 1935, Marienborg was acquired by lawyer and businessman C.L. David. David died in Copenhagen on 18 April 1960. As he had never married or fathered children, David left his entire estate to the C. L. David Foundation and Collection. At his request, the Marienborg country estate was willed to the Danish State, to be used as the summer residence of the country's prime or foreign minister. The State officially took over Marienborg in January 1962. His former city home in Kronprinsessegade was converted into a museum under the bane Thege David Collection.

=== Government ownership ===
Jens Otto Krag did not wish to use Marienborg and the property was therefore put at the disposal of his foreign minister, Per Hækkerup. Hilmar Baunsgaard used Marienborg as his primary residence. Anker Jørgensen became famous for preferring his modest apartment in the rundown Sydhavnen neighborhood of Copenhagen to Marienborg. In 1980, he started a new tradition of broadcasting the Prime Minister's official New Year's Speech from Marienborg.

Both Poul Schlüter and Poul Nyrup Rasmussen mainly used Marienborg as their summer residence. Crown Prince Frederik and Prince Joachim were privately tutored by Schlüter's wife Anne Marie Schlüter.

Anders Fogh Rasmussen started a new practice of using Marienborg mainly as a venue for political meetings and other official functions. This practice was continued by Helle Thorning Schmidt and Lars Løkke Rasmussen.

Lars Løkke Rasmussen used Marienborg as a venue for public St. Hans Evening celebrations.

== Architecture ==
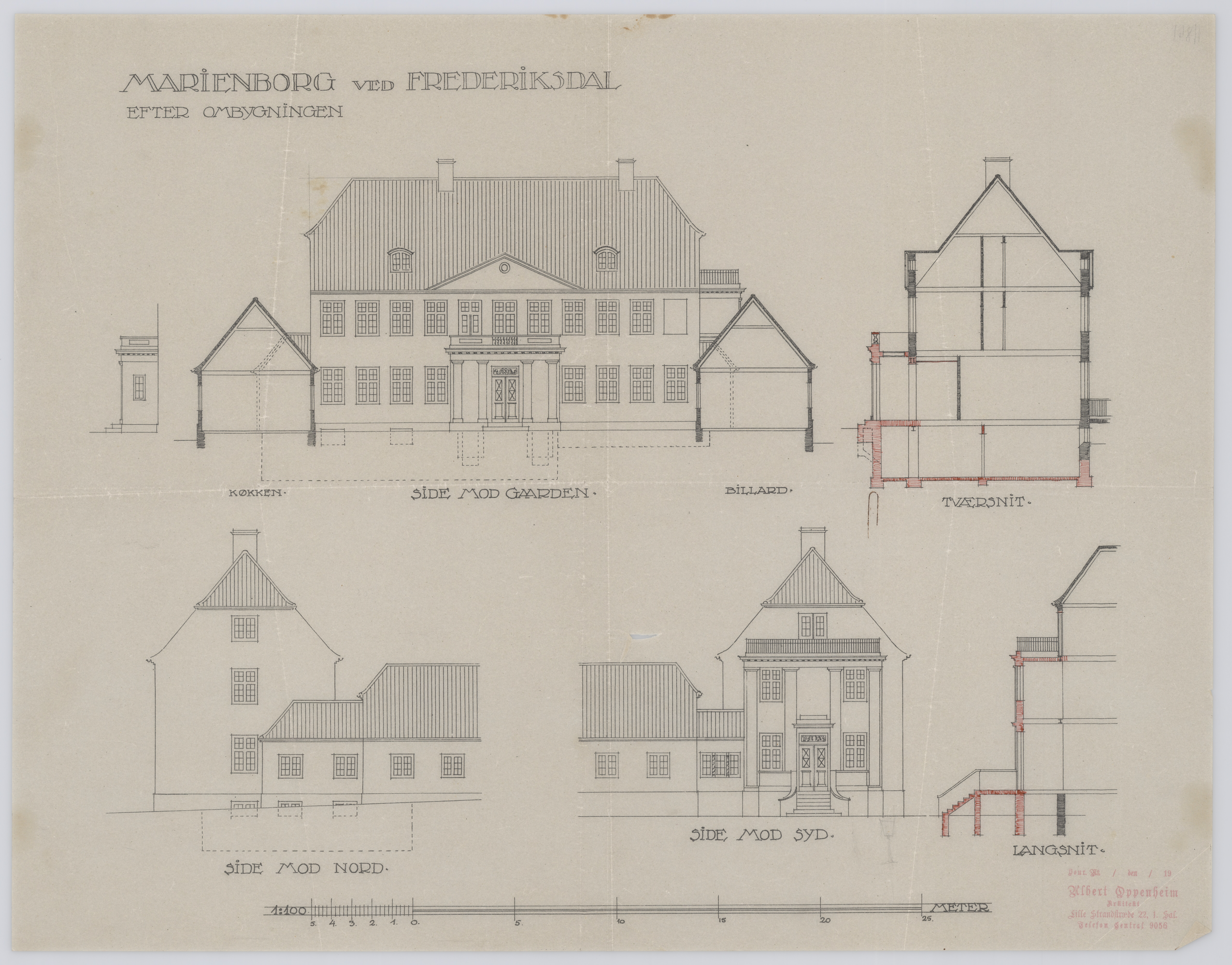
Rendering from Gotfred Teve's renovation.

Many different owners have left their marks on Marienborg and its architecture. The interiors have also been modified repeatedly. Today, Marienborg stands out as a restored classicist estate with a few carefully selected modern accents.

== Interior ==
The interior of the mansion was refurbished in 2018. The A.P. Møller and Hustru Chastine Mc-Kinney Møller Foundation has made a DKK 3.65 million donation for new furniture and art for the mansion.

== List of owners ==
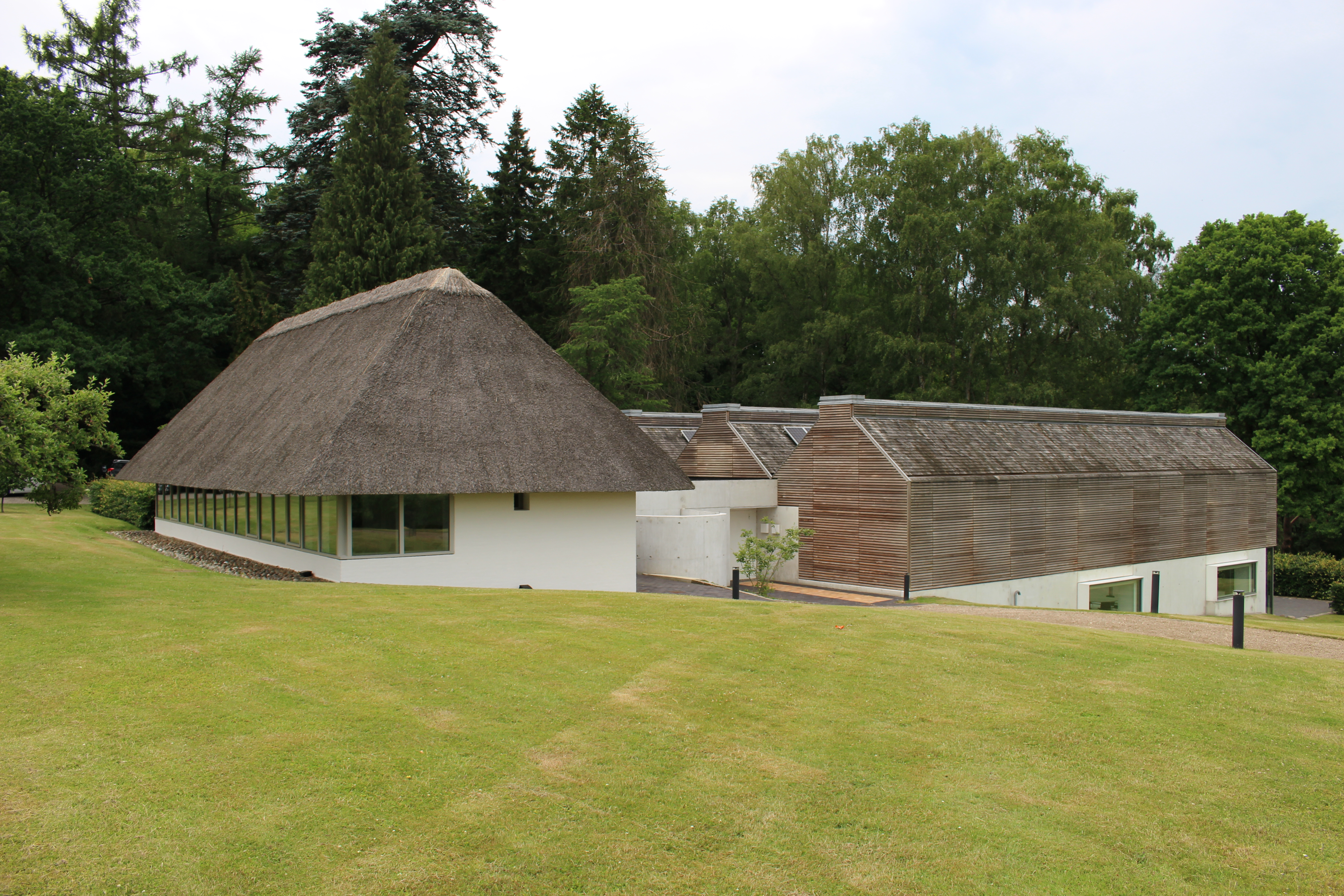
Modern garden pavilion

- (1745–1750) Captain Olfert Fas Fischer
- (1750–1753) Peter de Windt
- (1753–1755) Maria Cathrine Michaelsdatter Fabritius
- 1755–1764: Jacob Frederik Schaffalitzky de Muckadell
- (1764–1793) Gysbert Behagen
- (1793–1795) Hans Werner Rudolf Rosenkrantz Giedde
- (1795–1800) Johan Frederik Lindencrone
- (1800–1801) Johann Traugott Lebrecht Otto
- (1801–1803) Julius Ludvig Frederik Rantzau/Johan de Windt
- (1803–1807) Jean de Coninck
- (1807–1809) Estate of Jean de Coninck
- (1809–1824) Peter Boll Wivet
- (1824–1849) Cathrine Ernst
- (1849) Cecilie Wivet
- (1849–1855) Edvard Knudsen
- (1855–1863) Vilhelm Junius Lorentz Petersen
- 1863–1864: Estate of Vilhelm Junius Lorentz Petersen
- 1864–1885: Rosalie Hennings
- 1885–1899: Moltke family
- 1899–1915: Oscar Wandel
- 1915–1934: Vilhelm Skovgaard-Petersen
- 1934–1960: C. L. David
- 1960–1962: Estate of C. L. David
- 1962–present: State residence

=== State ownership: Prime Ministers ===
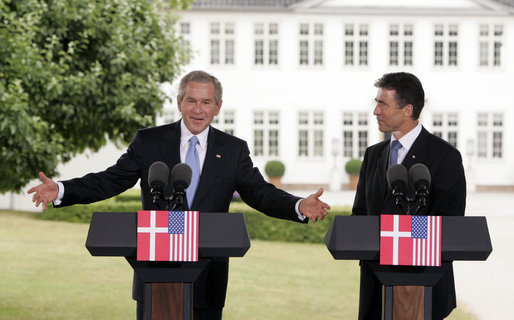
U.S. President George W. Bush and Prime Minister Anders Fogh Rasmussen holding a joint press conference in the gardens of Marienborg, July 2005.

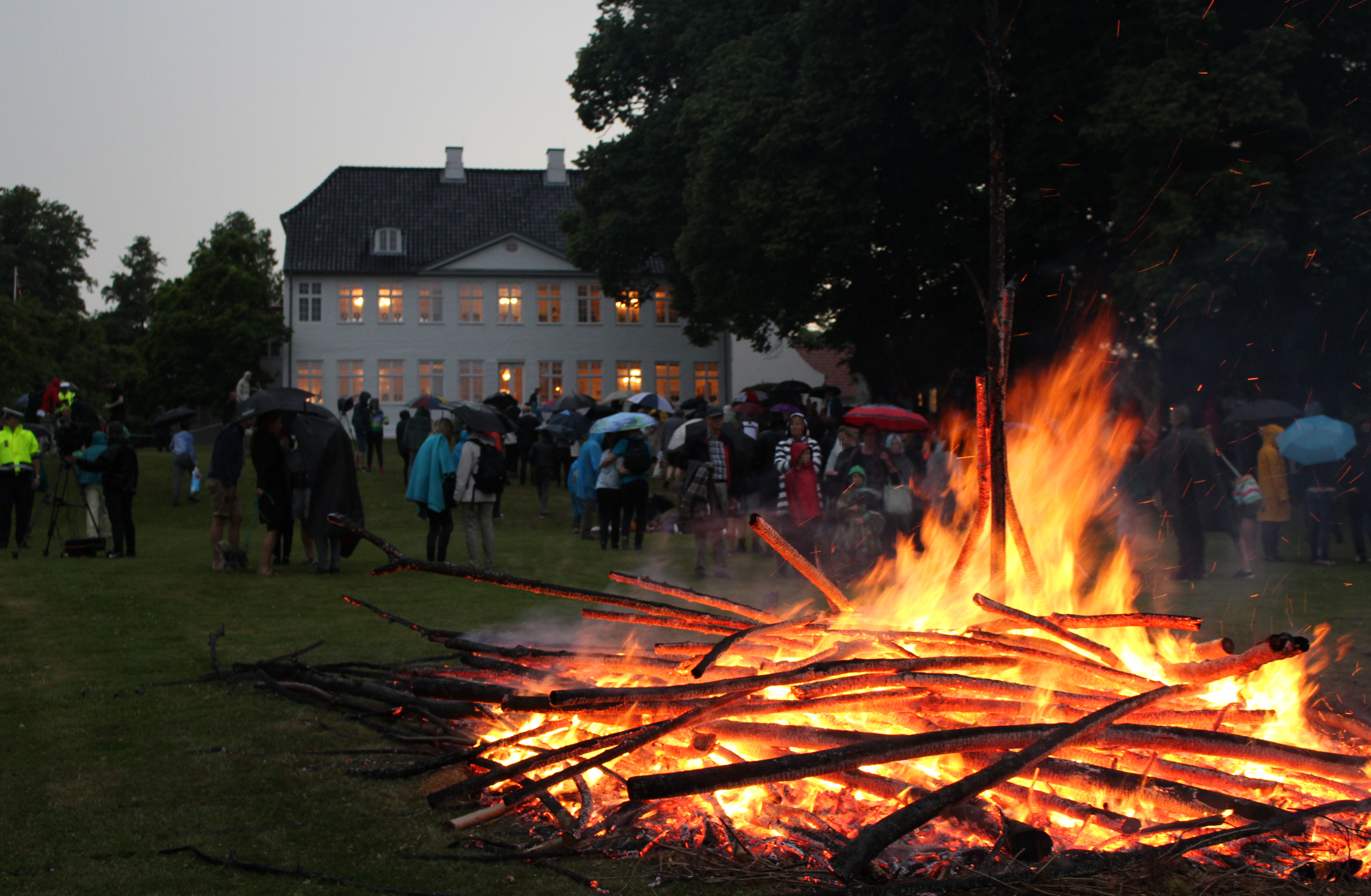
Saint John's Eve 2016.

- Viggo Kampmann 1960–1962 (born Viggo Olfert Fischer Kampmann, a descendant of the original owner)
- Jens Otto Krag 1962–1968, 1971–1972
- Hilmar Baunsgaard 1968–1971
- Anker Jørgensen 1972–1973; 1975–1982
- Poul Hartling 1973–1975
- Poul Schlüter 1982–1993
- Poul Nyrup Rasmussen 1993–2001
- Anders Fogh Rasmussen 2001–2009
- Lars Løkke Rasmussen 2009–2011, 2015–2019
- Helle Thorning-Schmidt 2011–2015
- Mette Frederiksen 2019–present
