= Jean de Coninck =

Dutch-Danish merchant

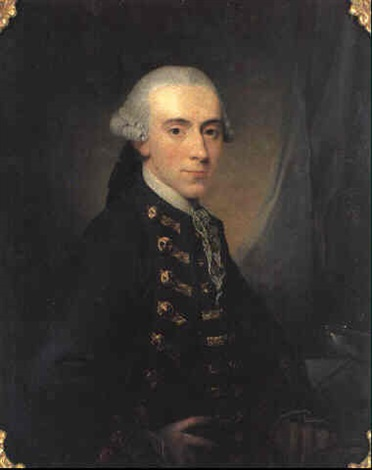
Jean de Coninck painted by Jens Juel in 1768

Jean de Coninck (1744–1807) was a Dutch-Danish merchant and ship-owner. In 1785, he joined his elder brother, Frédéric de Coninck, as partner in the Copenhagen-based trading house Coninck & Reiersen. He purchased the country house Marienborg in 1803 and was from 1806 a co-owner of the Royal Danish Silk Manufactury in Bredgade. He served as Russian consul in Copenhagen.

== Biography ==
Jean de Coninck was born in the Netherlands, the son of Jean de Coninck (1692–1774) and Susanne Esther de Rapin de Thoyras (1710–1785).

His first wife, Theodora van Schellebeck (1755–1783), died just 23 years old in Holland. de Coninck moved to Copenhagen in 1784. On 7 January 1785, he was married to Christiane Cathrine Reiersen (1755–1789), a younger sister of Niels Lunde Reiersen. In early February, he replaced Reiersen as partner of Coninck & Reiersen.

de Coninck's wife gave birth to daughter Anna Elisabeth in 1786 and son Jean Frederik in 1788. She died in labour with their third child in 1789.

In 1806, Coninck purchased the Royal Danish Silk Manufactury in Bredgade in a partnership with his brother, Charles August Selby and William Duntzfelt. In 1803. he purchased the country house Marienborg. He died in 1807.

== Family ==
He had the following children:

- Pierre de Coninck
- Sophie Marie de Coninck
- Henriette Charlotte de Coninck
- Charles Auguste de Coninck
- Paul Emile de Coninck
- William de Coninck
- Anne Elisabeth de Coninck
- Jean Frédéric de Coninck
