= Royal Danish Silk Manufactury =

- Den Kongelige Silkemanufaktur
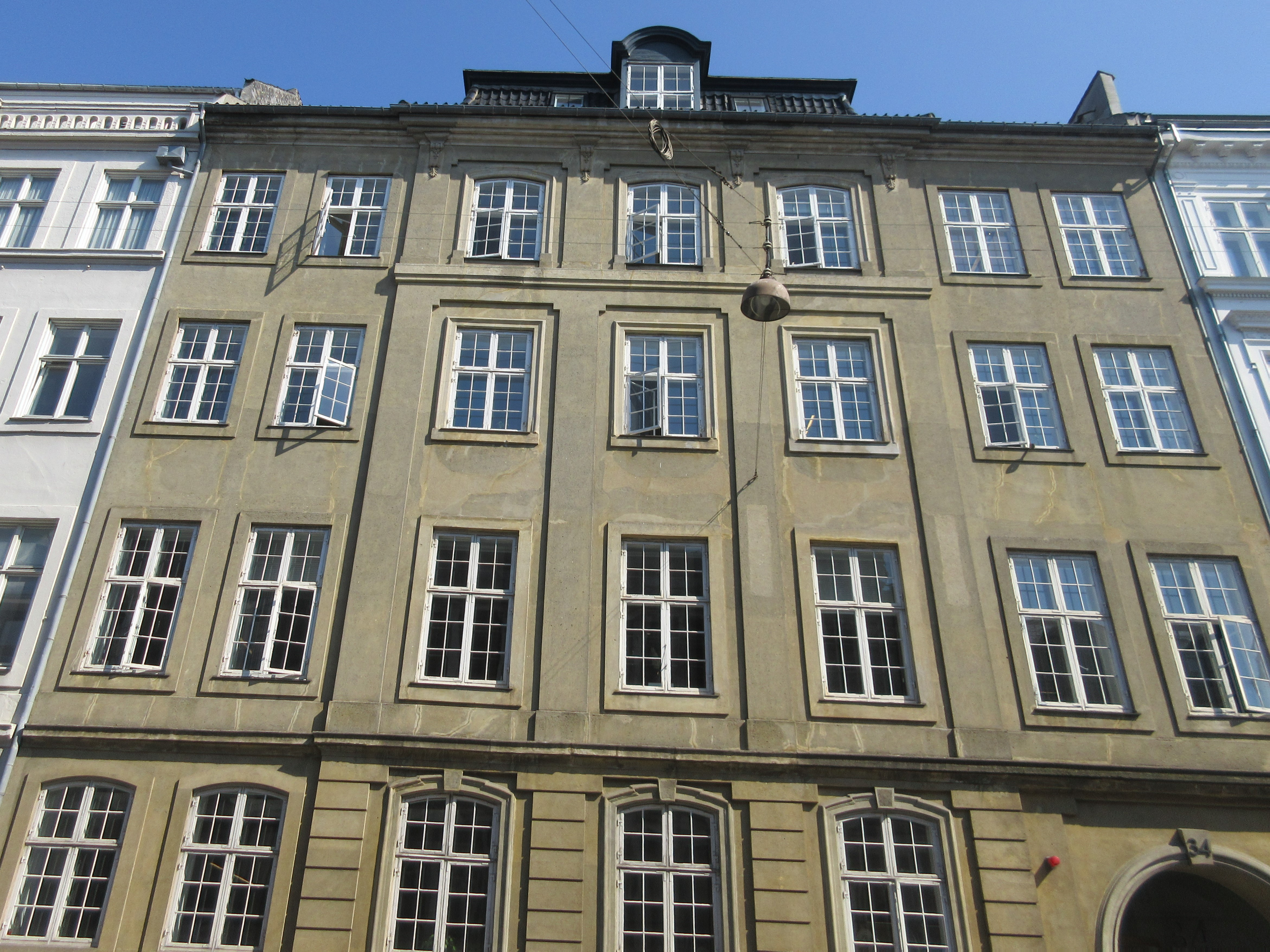
- Bredgade 34 in 2023
- Interactive map of the Royal Danish Silk Manufactury area

General information
- Location: Bredgade 36, Copenhagen, Denmark
- Coordinates: 55°41′1.09″N 12°35′23.63″E
- Completed: 1756

The Royal Danish Silk Manufactury (Danish: Den Kongelige Silkemanufaktur) was located at Bredgade 34 and 36 in Copenhagen, Denmark. The building fronting the street at No. 34 was listed on the Danish registry of protected buildings and placed by the Danish Heritage Agency on 12 March 1951. The rear wings and the building at No.36 are not listed.

== History ==
The Royal Silk Manufactory was originally established by John Beckett at the corner of Store Kongensgade (No. 83) and Hindegade in 1739. It was destroyed by fire but was rebuilt by his successor, Charles Maillot (1718-1745), a Frenchman, with support from the kommercekollegiet, in 1742. The new factory was built by Philip de Lange. It was destroyed by fire in 1745, It was rebuilt but went bankrupt shortly thereafter. Maillot left the country but died in Quebec later that same year.

Peter Reiersen (1713-1773), who had been appointed as bookkeeper at Almindelige Varemagasin in 1738, managed to revive the operations. It had 43 looms and 143 workers.

A large new factory complex was constructed in Bredgade in 1755-56. Reiersen answered to four directors: Gilles Willhelm Daemen (1702-1787), Conrad Christian Dauw (1693-1775), Peter van Hurk (1667-1775) and Cornelius Schumacher (1703-1777). The latter was married to Reiersen's sister, Elisabeth Reiersen (1718-1755).

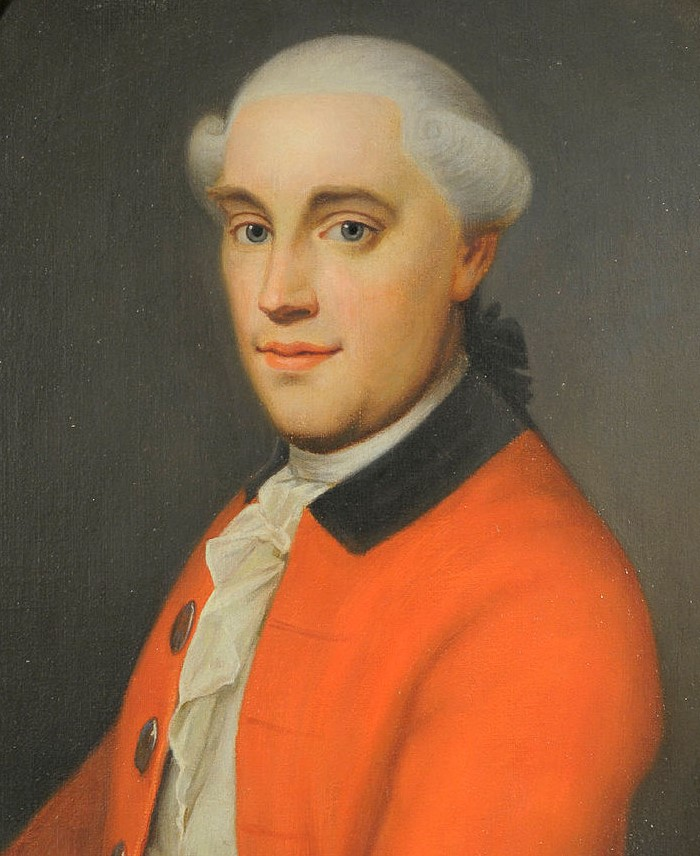
Miels Lunde Reiersen

The production stagnated in the 1770s. In earky 1775 it was taken over by Niels Lunde Reiersen. At this point the number of employees had fallen to 28 weavers and approximately one hundred workers.

After Lunde Reiersen's death in 1795 it was taken over by his business partner Hans Brandorph. He lived with his family in one of the apartments. Friderich Hoppe (1770-1837), the owner of Rosenfeldt at Vordingborg and a board member of the Reiersen Foundation, lived in another apartment.

He went bankrupt in 1802. The silk production was for a while revived by John Baverstock with support from kommercekollegiet. John and Robert (Richard?) Baverstock had together with four silk workers had come to Copenhagen from London to establish a silk production.

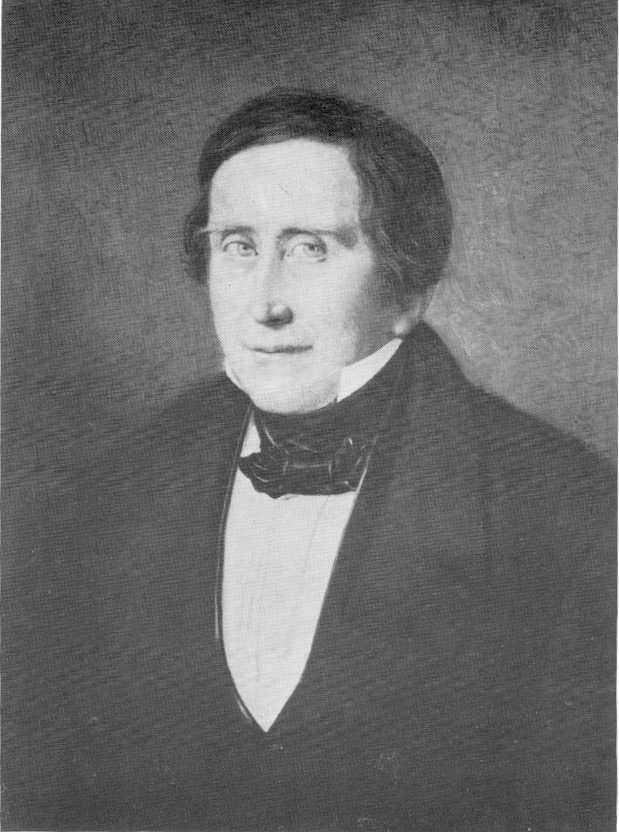
Johan Carl Modeweg

The factory was in 1806 sold to Charles August Selby, Frédéric de Coninck, Jean de Coninck and William Duntzfelt. In 18011, it was sold to Jean Frederik Christian Gandil (1791-1840). From 1813 to 1825, it was owned by Ulrich Christian von Schmidten and Ole Christian Borch. The complex was acquired by Johan Carl Modeweg in 1825 and once again turned into a textile factory, but he moved the production to Brede Works in 1831.

The complex was later home to Bredgade Steam Mill. It closed in 1897. The buildings were then acquired by piano manufacturer Hindsberg.

Several prominent residents have also lived in the complex. The later Minister of Defence Christian Frederik Hansen lived at No. 34 in 1824-1825. A composer lived at No. 34 from 1874 to 1884.

== Architecture ==
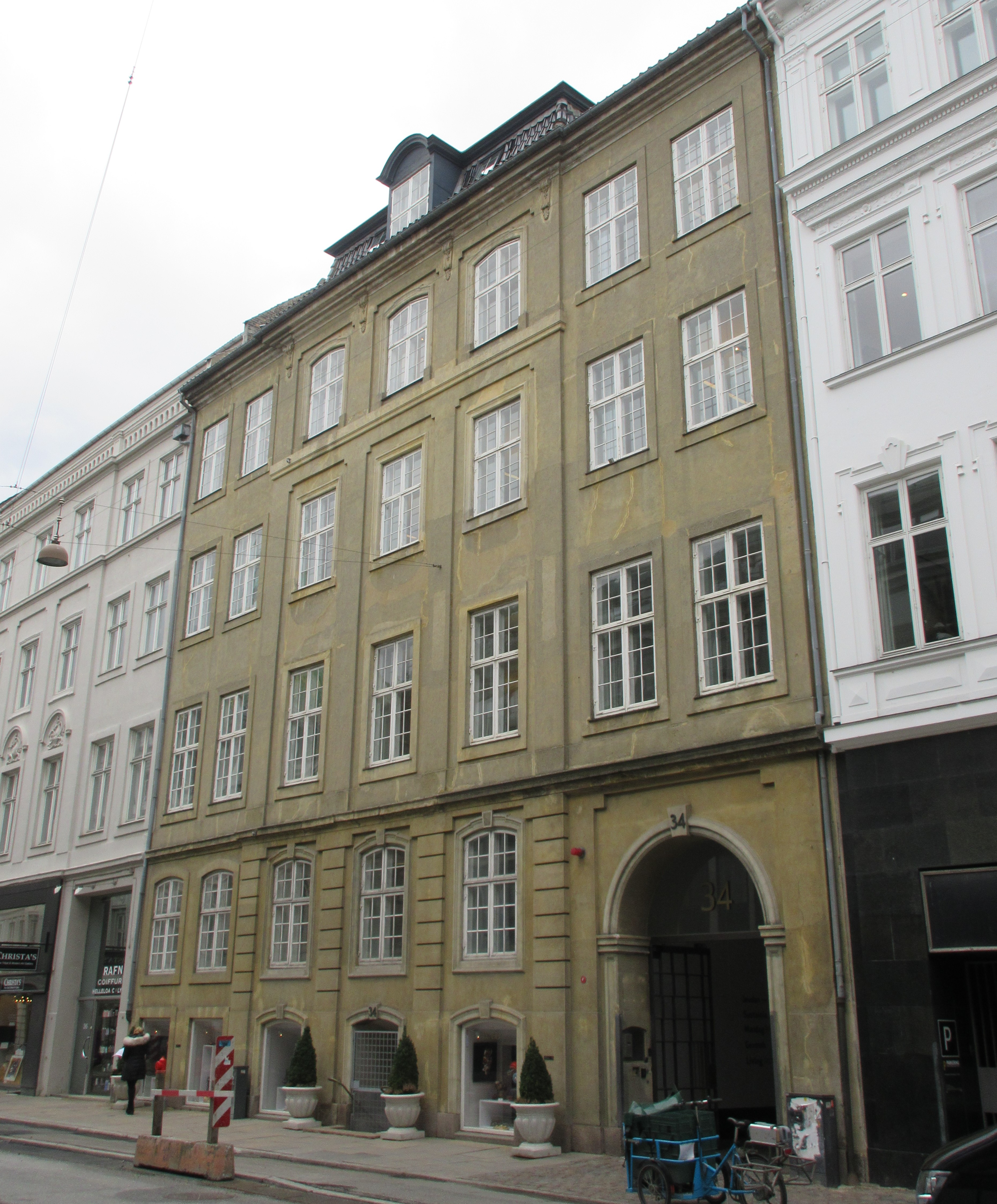
Bredgade 34

The complex is centred on two courtyards. The architect was possibly Niels Eigtved. The building fronting the street served as headquarters and also contained a residence for the manager.

== List of owners ==
- (1756-59) the Crown with Peter Reiersen as leader
- (760-73) Peter Reiersen
- (1775-1796) Niels Lunde Reiersen
- (1796-1806) Hans Brandorph
- (1806-1811) Charles August Selby, Frédéric de Coninck, Jean de Coninck and William Duntzfelt
- (1811-1813) Frederik Christian Gandil
- (1813-1825) Ulrich Christian von Schmidten and Ole Christian Borch

== See also ==
- Silkegade
- Usserød Textile Factory
- List of industrial buildings in Denmark
