= Tusculum, Lyngby-Taarbæk Municipality =

Building in Lyngby-Taarbæk, Denmark

Tusculum
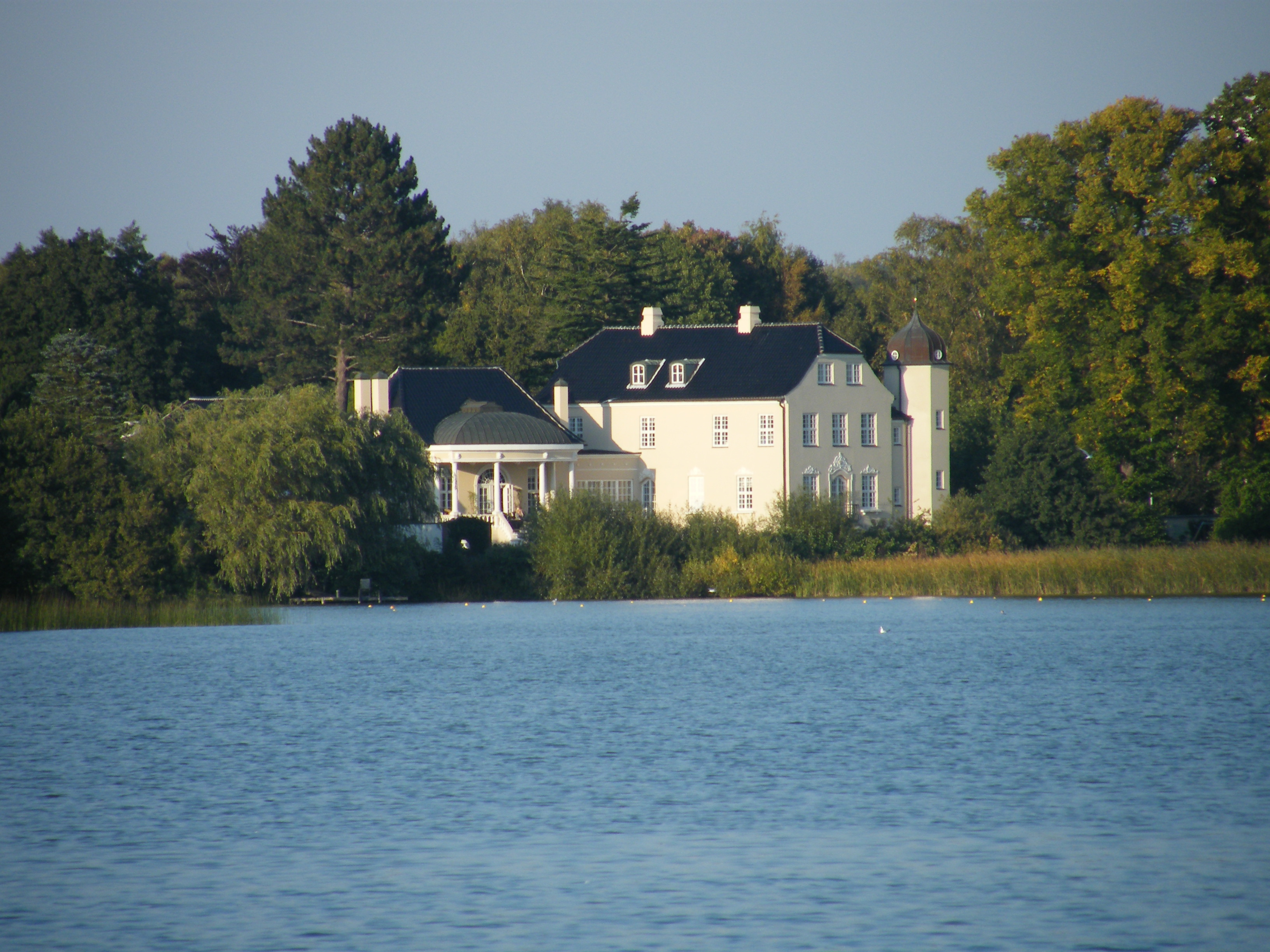
- Tusculum viewed from the other side of the lake
- Interactive map of the Tusculum area

General information
- Architectural style: Neoclassical
- Location: Nybrovej 375; 2800 Kongens Lyngby, Denmark
- Coordinates: 55°46′28.56″N 12°27′56.88″E
- Completed: 17th century
- Client: Carl Ludwig Drewsen

Tusculum (Nybrovej 375) is an 18th-century house situated on the north side of Bagsværd Lake, close to Marienborg and Sophienholm, Lyngby-Taarbæk Municipality, some 10 km north of central Copenhagen, Denmark.

== History ==
=== 18th century ===
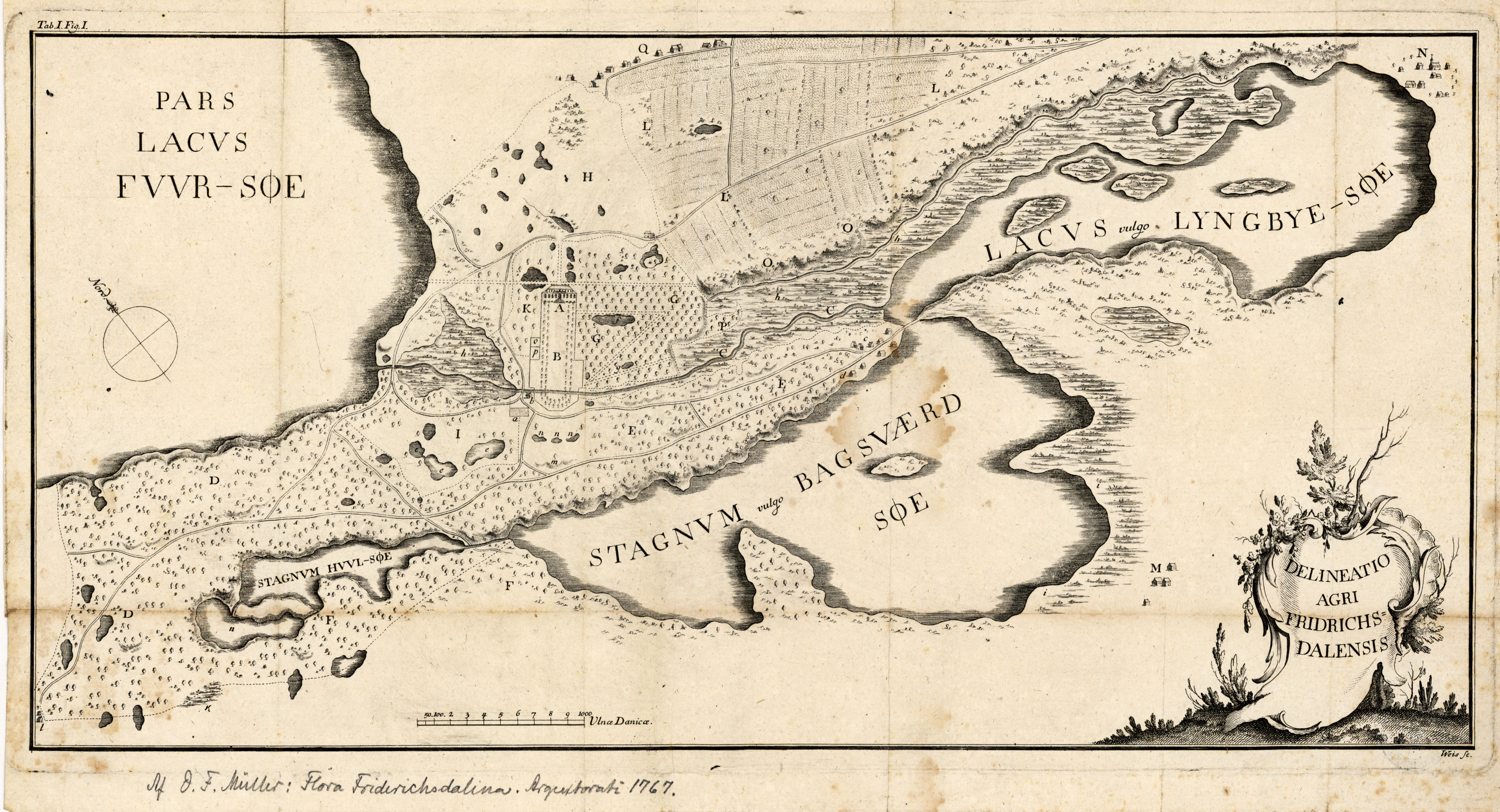
Ny Frederiksdal – seen as a cluster of unnamed houses – on a map from 1767

In the 18th century, the region north of Copenhagen became popular for its scenic views and opportunities for recreation with the surrounding meadows, woods and lakes, with many summer residences being built. Tusculum is one of several properties which were sold off from the Frederiksdal estate from the middle of the 18th century and used for the construction of country houses. They were collectively referred to as Ny Frederiksdal (New Frederiksdal) and also comprised Søro, Marienborg, Sophienholm and Christianelyst. Frederiksdal's first forester's house was formerly located on the site. In 1746, Joost and Gysbert van Hemert leased a parcel of land on the site from Frederiksdal's owner and used it for the construction of a country house. It was possibly expanded with more land in 1752 since a new leasing document (gæstebrev) was issued by the prime minister's widow that year. Joost van Hemert would later acquire his brother's share of the house. His widow kept the house until her death in 1778. The house was then passed to their son-in-law Admiral A. N. de Fontenay. In 1791, his widow sold it to Else Marie de Bang.

=== 19th century ===
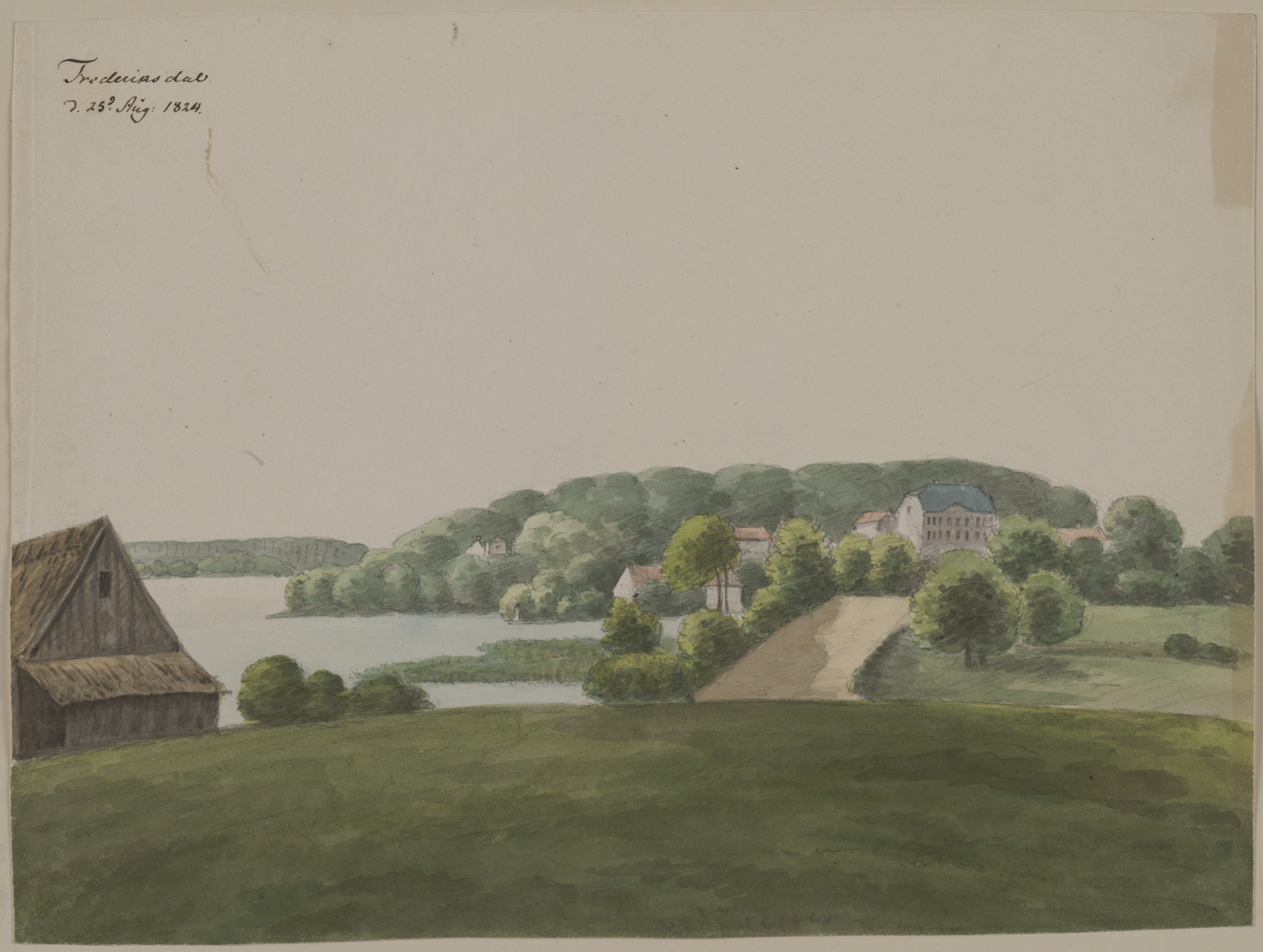
Ny y Frederiksdal with Tusculum and Marienborg seen in a drawing by Ole Jørgen Rawert from 25 August 1824

In 1798, she sold it to Jens Friedenreich Hage. The buildings and garden were located on both sides of the road. Hage's heirs sold Tusculum to pastor of the French Reformed Church in Copenhagen, J. A. RalTard. He owned it until 1850. In 1954, it was acquired by Gregers Christian, Count Raben. He gave it the name Tusculum. It had until then simply been referred to as Frederiksdal Lyststed (Frederikdal Country House) and presented it to his foster daughter Amalie Raben. In 1865, she married the Norwegian writer Andreas Munch.

Later owners included C. F. Rich and wine merchant Lorentz Petersen.

=== 21st century ===
In 2004, Tusculum was acquired for DKK 45 million by real estate agents Peter Norvig and Hanne Nørrisgaard. In 2013, Tusculum was acquired for DKK 45.5 million by Lars Kollind and Vibeke Wesarg Riemer.

== Today ==
In April 2023, it was put up for sale for DKK 72 million.
