= Henry Jacques Garrigues =

American physician

- Born: June 6, 1831; Copenhagen, Denmark
- Died: July 7, 1913 (aged 82); Tryon, North Carolina
- Education: University of Copenhagen Faculty of Health Sciences (PhD)
- Occupations: Medical physician and surgeon
- Parent(s): Jacques Louis Garrigue and Cecile Olivia Duntzfelt
- Scientific career
- Workplaces: New York Maternity Hospital Gynecologic Department of the German Dispensary

Henry Jacques Garrigues (June 6, 1831 – July 7, 1913) was a Danish-born American medical doctor considered to have introduced antiseptic obstetrics to the United States.

== Early life and education ==
Garrigues was born in Copenhagen, Denmark to the French Huguenot merchant Jacques Louis Garrigue (1789–1854) and his wife Cecile Olivia Duntzfelt (1798–1863), daughter of Danish merchant William Duntzfelt and granddaughter of Frédéric de Coninck. Charlotte Garrigue, the first lady of Czechoslovakia, was his niece. His first cousin included Malvina Garrigues, the noted soprano.

== Career ==
Garrigues graduated from the University of Copenhagen Faculty of Health Sciences with a medical degree in 1869.After graduating, Garrigues moved to the United States where he resided and worked in New York City. He was named an obstetric surgeon at the New York Maternity Hospital and a physician in the Gynecologic Department of the German Dispensary (now Lenox Hill Hospital). In 1877, Garrigues became a fellow of the American Gynecological Society and was made vice president in 1897.

He was responsible for bring aseptic or antiseptic OB/GYN to America in Oct 1 1883. [Ref: listed on his tombstone]

== Death ==
On July 7, 1913, Garrigues died at his home in Tryon, North Carolina, aged 82. He is buried in that city.

== Bibliography ==
- Garrigues H.J. (1882) Diagnosis of Ovarian Cysts by Means of the Examination of Their Contents, William Wood, New York City, NY
- (1886) Practical Guide in Antiseptic Midwifery in Hospital and Private Practice, G.S. Davis, Detroit, MI
- (1902) A Textbook of the Science and Art of Obstetrics, J.B. Lippincott, Philadelphia, PA
- (1905) Gynecology, Medical and Surgical, J.B. Lippincott, Philadelphia, PA
