= Store Kongensgade 81 =

Building in Copenhagen, Denmark

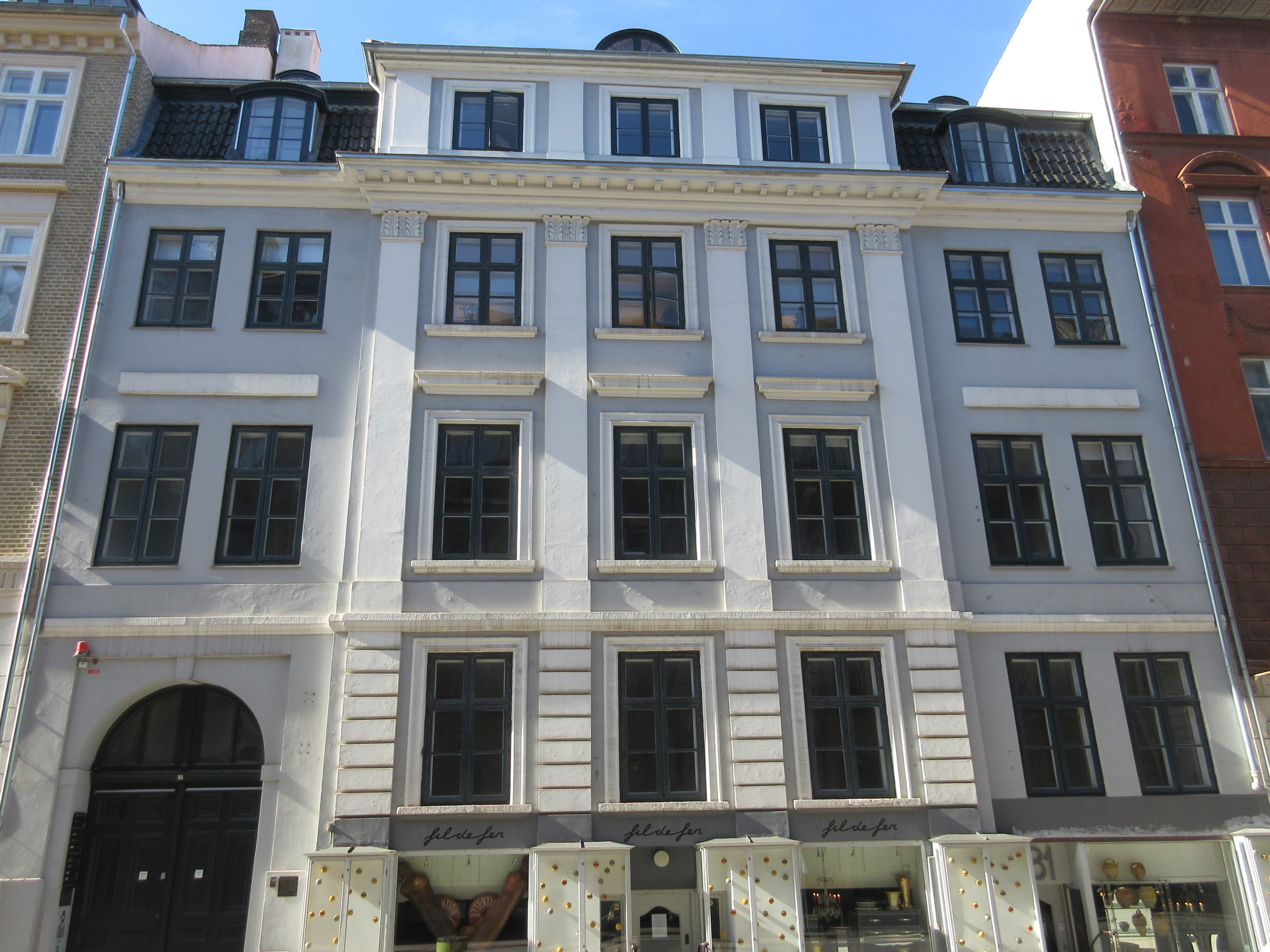
- Interactive map of the Store Kongensgade 81 area

General information
- Architectural style: Neoclassical
- Location: Copenhagen, Denmark
- Coordinates: 55°41′8.05″N 12°35′18.56″E
- Completed: 1785

Store Kongensgade 81 is a Neoclassical property situated in Store Kongensgade between Frederiksgade and Hindegade, in Copenhagen, Denmark. The complex consists of a Neoclassical residential building from the 1780s fronting the street and a number of somewhat older secondary wings, surrounding two consecutive courtyards, on its rear. It was listed in the Danish registry of protected buildings and places in 1918. The artist Lorenz Frølich, whose father and uncle owned the property for almost 50 years, spent his childhood at the site. Other notable former residents include former Governor-General of the Danish West Indies Frederik von Walterstorff, historian and social critic Niels Ditlev Riegels, physician Johan Daniel Herholdt (1764-1836) and painter August Schiøtt. The property is now owned by Jeudan.

== History ==
=== 17th and 18th centuries ===
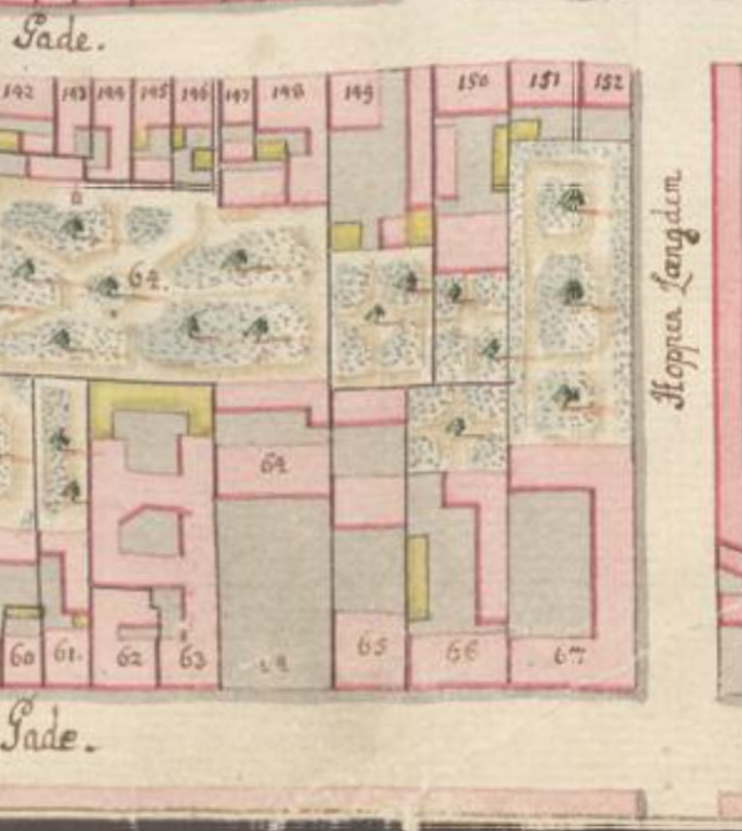
No. 66 seen in a detail from Christian Gedde's map of St. Ann's West Quarter, 1757

The property is located in an area formerly known as New Copenhagen, which was not incorporated into the fortified city until the 1670s. The property was listed in 1689 as No. 158 in St. Ann's West Quarter (Sankt Annæ Vester Kvarter) owned by Jochum Scharnhorst. It was listed in 1756 as No. 66 owned by cellarman Philip Jacob Salathe.

=== Petermann and his building ===
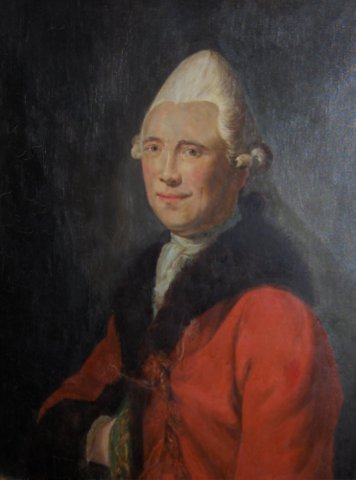
Otto Christopher von Munthe af Morgenstierne

The present building on the site was constructed in 1784–1785 by master mason Melchior Henrick Petermann. At the time of the 1787 census, Petersen was himself among the residents of the building. He lived there with his wife Anne Augustine, their seven children (one son and six daughters), an apprentice, a coachman and two maids. Otto Christopher von Munthe af Morgenstierne resided in another apartment with his six children (one son and five daughters), a tutor, two male servants, a coachman, the building's caretaker and six maids. Carl Friderich Castonier (1651–1676), a lieutenant-colonel in the Danish Life Guards Regiment, resided in a third apartment with his wife Cornelia Eleonore, two of their children (aged 15 and 23), two soldiers from his regiment and a maid. Johann Chreok, a 27-year-old first mate (styrmand), resided in another apartment with his 47-year-old wife Anne Catharine, eight children from the wife's three earlier marriages (aged four to 21), a maid and a lodger.

Niels Ditlev Riegels (1755–1802), a historian and social critic, was among the residents of the building from 1788 to 1792.

=== Brøer family ===
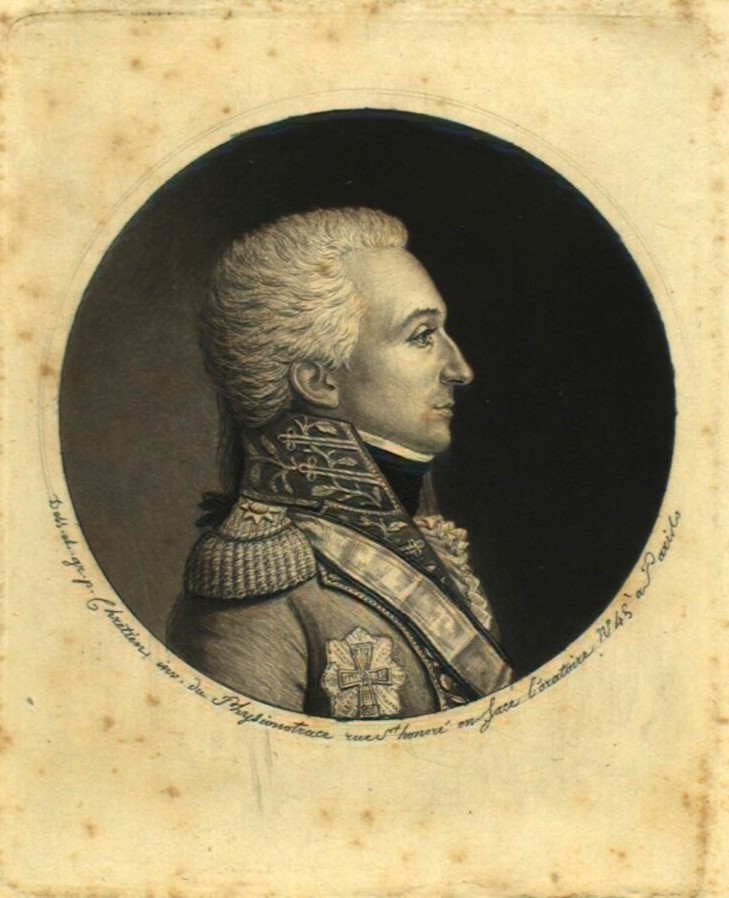
Ernst Frederik von Walterstorff

The property was later acquired by commander-captain Hans Conrad Brøer (1740–1812). His property was home to 31 residents in five households at the 1801 census. The owner resided in one of the apartments with his wife Frederikke Christiane (née Silberschild), his 12-year-old niece Frederikke Trepka, one male servant, one coachman and two maids. Ernst Frederik Walterstorff, a former governor-general of the Danish West Indies and the owner of Kokkedal, resided in another apartment with his wife Sally Walterstorff, their son Christian Korteligt Walterstorff, two maids and four black servants (aged eight to 26). He later moved to Paris as part of the Danish diplomatic mission. Ole Christian Borch (1751–1818), a bookkeeper, resided in another apartment with his wife Christiane Borch (née Nielsen), six children (aged one to 21) and four maids. Jorck Christopher Snorbusch, a mason, resided in the last dwelling with his wife Marie Lisbeth Snorbusch, a maid and a lodger.

The property was listed as No. 65 in the new cadastre of 1806. It was still owned by Brøer at the time. Johan Daniel Herholdt (1764–1836), a surgeon, then with the title of Admiralty Medicus, was among the residents from 1814 to 1816.

=== Frølich family, 1820s–1870s ===
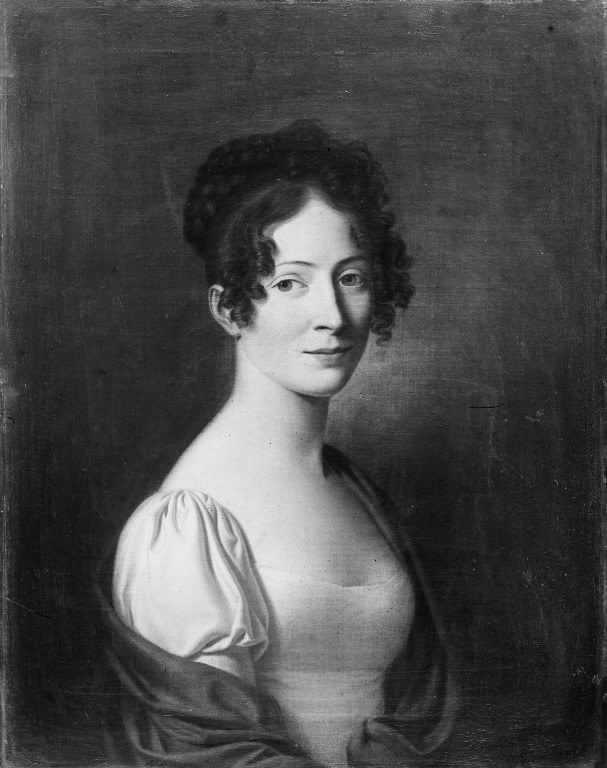
Marie Sophie Frølich, née de Coninck, by Christian Gottlieb Kratzenstein Stub

The property was later acquired by the brothers and business partners Heinrich Lorentz Frølich (1787–1873) and Johan Jacob Frølich (1781–1858). Their father had founded the successful trading company Frølich & Co., which was for many years based at Østergade 49. The two brothers had previously owned Admiralgade 25 for a few years, from 1813 until 1816.

At the time of the 1834 census, No. 54 was home to three households. H.L. Frølich resided on the ground floor with his wife Marie Sophie de Coninck, 18-year-old Henr. Sophie de Coninck, two male servants and two maids. J.J. Frølich resided on the first floor with his wife Pauline Wilhelmine Jutein, their three children (aged 13 to 19), two male servants and two maids. Frederik Emil Frisch, a government official with title of justitsråd, resided on the second floor with his wife Juliane Frisch (née Frølich), their 11-year-old daughter, one male servant and two maids. Pehr Pehrson, a concierge, resided in the basement with his wife Berthe Olsen and their 14-year-old son.

Heinrich Lorentz Frølich—who for a while served as one of the managers of the Bank of Denmark—was married to Marie Sophie de Coninck (1782–1874), a daughter of Jean de Coninck. The couple, who had no children, resided on the ground floor. At the time of the 1840 census, they lived there with 24-year-old Sophie de Coninck (1816–1870), concierge Pehr Pehrson and his wife Birthe Person, a coachman, a male servant, a maid and a female cook. Sophie de Coninck was a granddaughter of Jean de Coninck's brother Frédéric de Coninck.

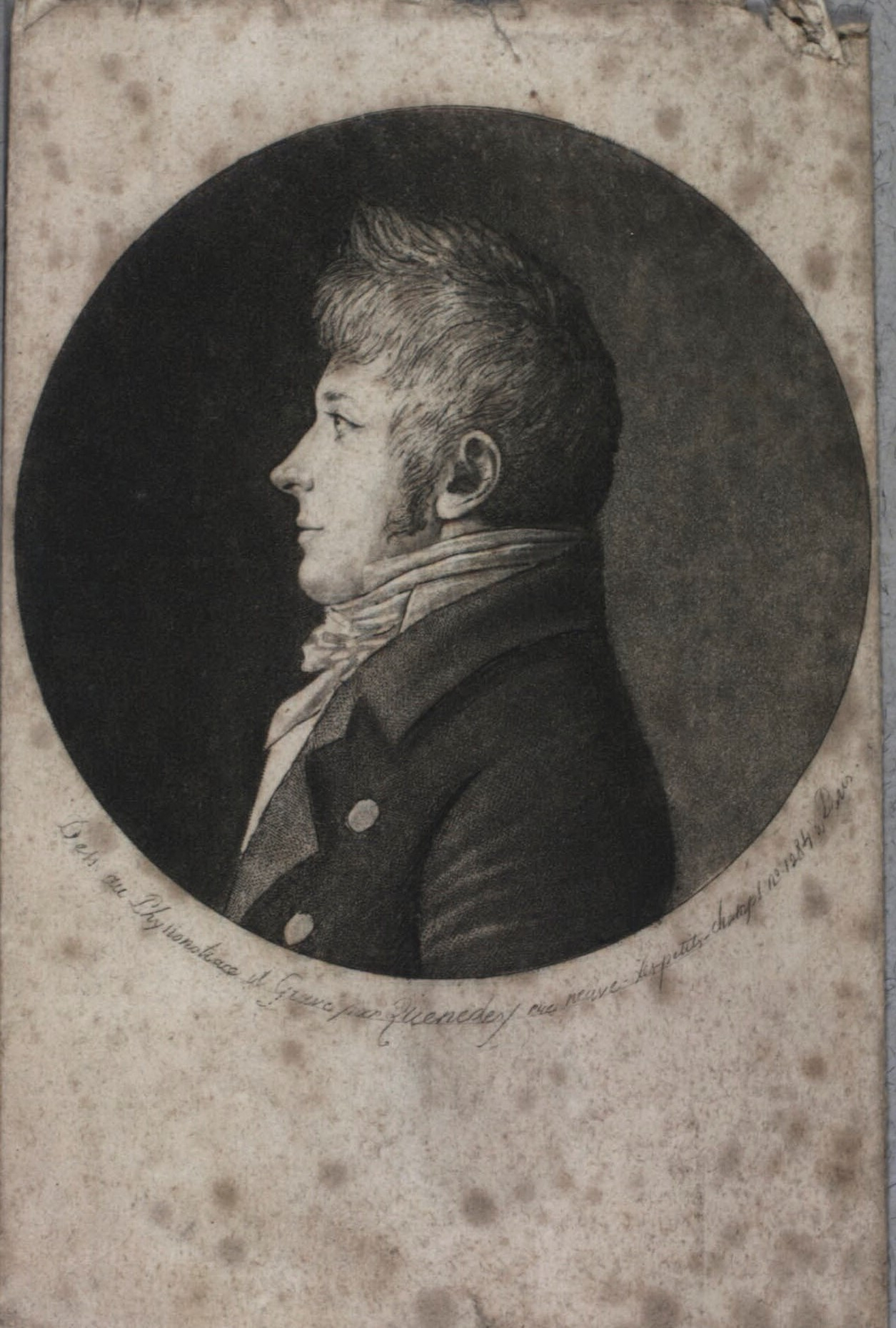
Johan Jacob Frølich

Johan Jacob Frølich was married to Pouline Wilhelmine Tutein (1789–1881), daughter of Friederich Tutein. At the time of the 1840 census, they resided on the first floor with their three children, a caretaker, a male servant and two maids. Frederik Emil Frisch (1790–1853), Generalkrigscommissair, Land og Søe Krigscommissair, resided on the second floor with his wife Juliane Frølich, 16-year-old Emma Jacobsen, a female cook, a maid and a male servant. The eldest of their sons Jacob (James, 1811–1850) had by then already settled in Spain. The youngest son was the artist Lorenz Frølich. Their third son, Frederik (1913–1880), a naval officer, reached the rank of commander. Their daughter Wilhelmine (1817–1962) would later marry Petrus Frederik Constantin Brun, a grandson of Constantin Brun and the owner of Krogerup Manor.

In 1847, Heinrich Lorentz Frølich constructed the country house Blidah on the coast north of Copenhagen. His brother had already owned the country house Bloksbjerg for some time.

The property was home to five households at the 1860 census. Heinruch Lorenz Frølich and Marie Sophie (née de Voninck) resided on the ground floor with a servant, a coachman, a maid and a female cook. Christian Wilhelm Hagen (1792-1871), governor of the Bank of Denmark, resided on the first floor with his wife Elise Augusta Ketty Hagen (née Kornerup, 1798-1878), their daughter Marie Elise Hagen, a female cook, a maid and a coachman. Emil Carl Ferdinand Rühring, a travelling salesman, resided in the building with his wife Gjertrud Christine Rühring, their two children (aged eight and nine) and a maid. Peter Godisen Vilsort, a servant at the Finnish Embassy, resided in the building with his wife Ida Louise Charlotte Vilsort, their nine-year-old foster daughter and husjomfru Wilhelmine Dinesen. Lars Kaspersen resided in the building with his wife Anne Kerstine.

=== Later history ===
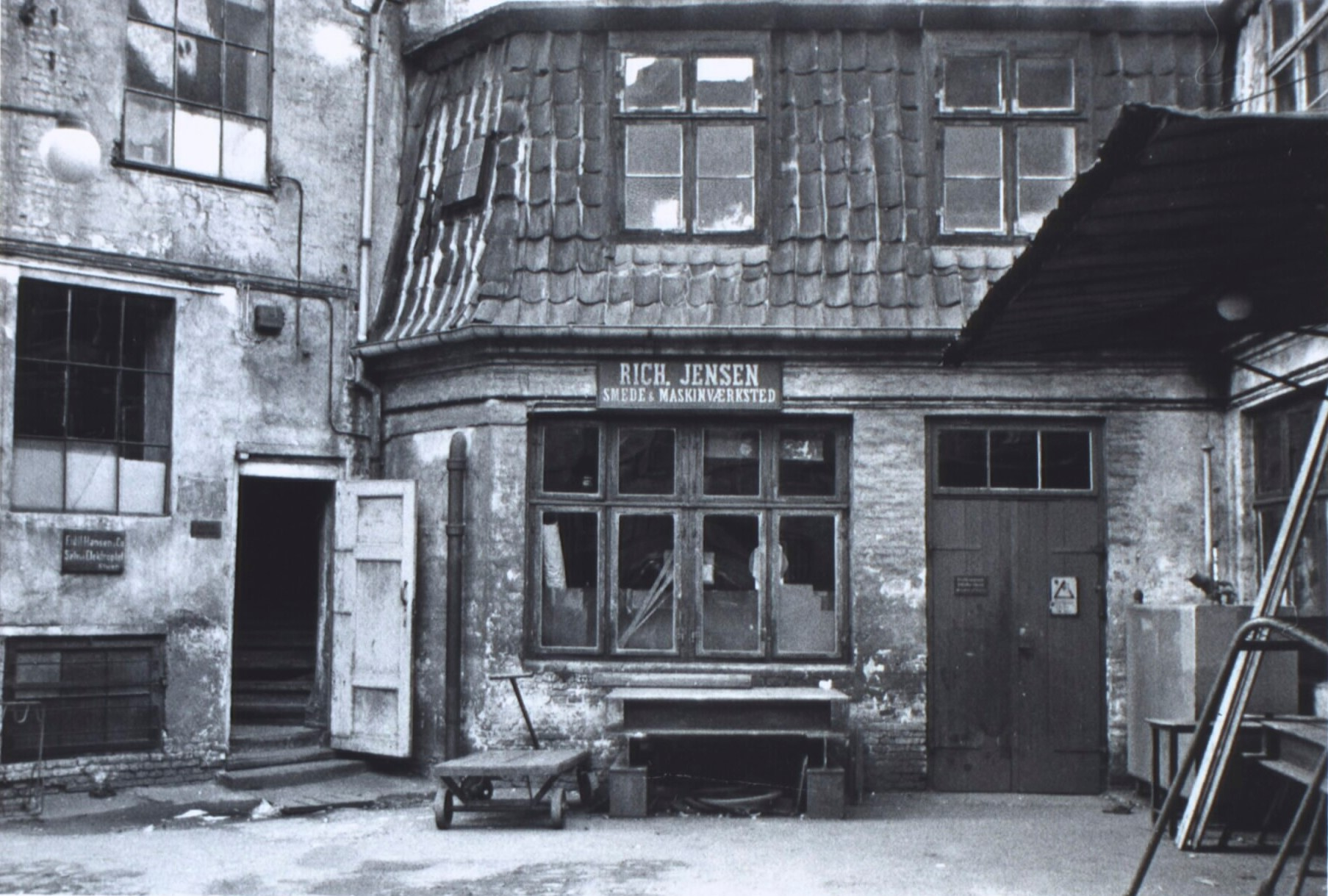
Rich. Jensen, Smede & Maskinværksted

August Schiøtt, one of the leading Danish portrait painters of his time, resided on the second floor from 1875 to 1879 and again from 1881 to 1884. He then moved to a residence at Charlottenborg after being appointed as professor at the Royal Danish Academy of Fine Arts.

A/S Oscar Frønckel & Co.'s Bogtrykkeri, a book printing business, was founded in the building in 1916. In 1918, it relocated to larger premises at Nyhavn 31.

Alex Vincent's Kunstforlag A/S, an old printing business converted into a limited company with Alex Vincent (1906-) as owner and CEO, was based in the building in 1950. Richard Jensen, Smede & Maskinværksted, a machine workshop, was based in the courtyard in the 1960s.

== Architecture ==
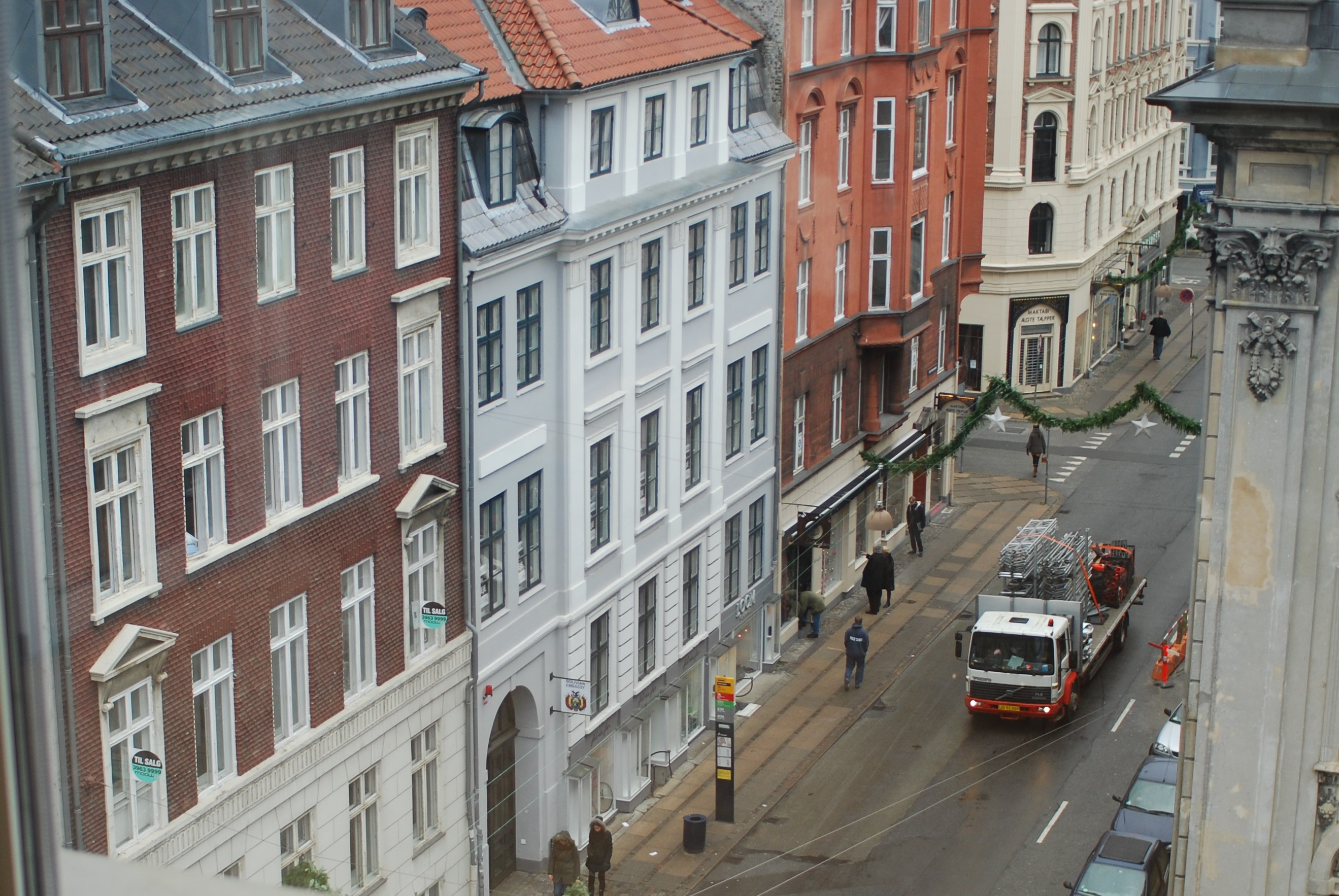
Store Kongensgade 81, viewed from a window at the corner of Frederiksgade

The building fronting the street is constructed with three storeys over a walk-out basement. The dressed seven-bay-wide facade features a three-bay median risalit and a two-bay arched gateway in the left-hand side of the building. The median risalit is finished with shadow joints on the lower floors (basement and ground floor) and pilasters with capitals on the upper floors. The facade is horizontally divided by a belt course above the ground floor. The cornice is modillioned on the three central bays. The roof is a mansard roof clad in red tile, featuring a three-bay wall dormer, flanked by one more window on each side. The pilasters of the median risalit continue visually as lesenes on the three-bay wall dormer. The main entrance is located in the interior north wall of the gateway.

An eight-bay-long side wing projects from the rear side of the front wing along the north side of the first of two consecutive courtyards. The side wing is topped by a red tile roof and features three gabled dormers with pulleys. The side wing is on the other end attached to a cross wing, separating the two courtyards from each other. The cross wing is attached in the south to another somewhat shorter side wing. Another side wing projects from the rear side of the cross wing along the north side of the second courtyard. This side wing is on the other end attached to a long rear wing. All the facades facing the two courtyards are rendered yellow.

== Today ==
In 2008, Store Kongensgade 81 was owned by Danica Butikscenter A/S. In August 2014, it was acquired by Jeudan. It contains a total of 13 leases with a combined floor area of 3,000 square metres.

== See also ==
- Brøndumgård
