= C. L. David =

Danish lawyer and businessman

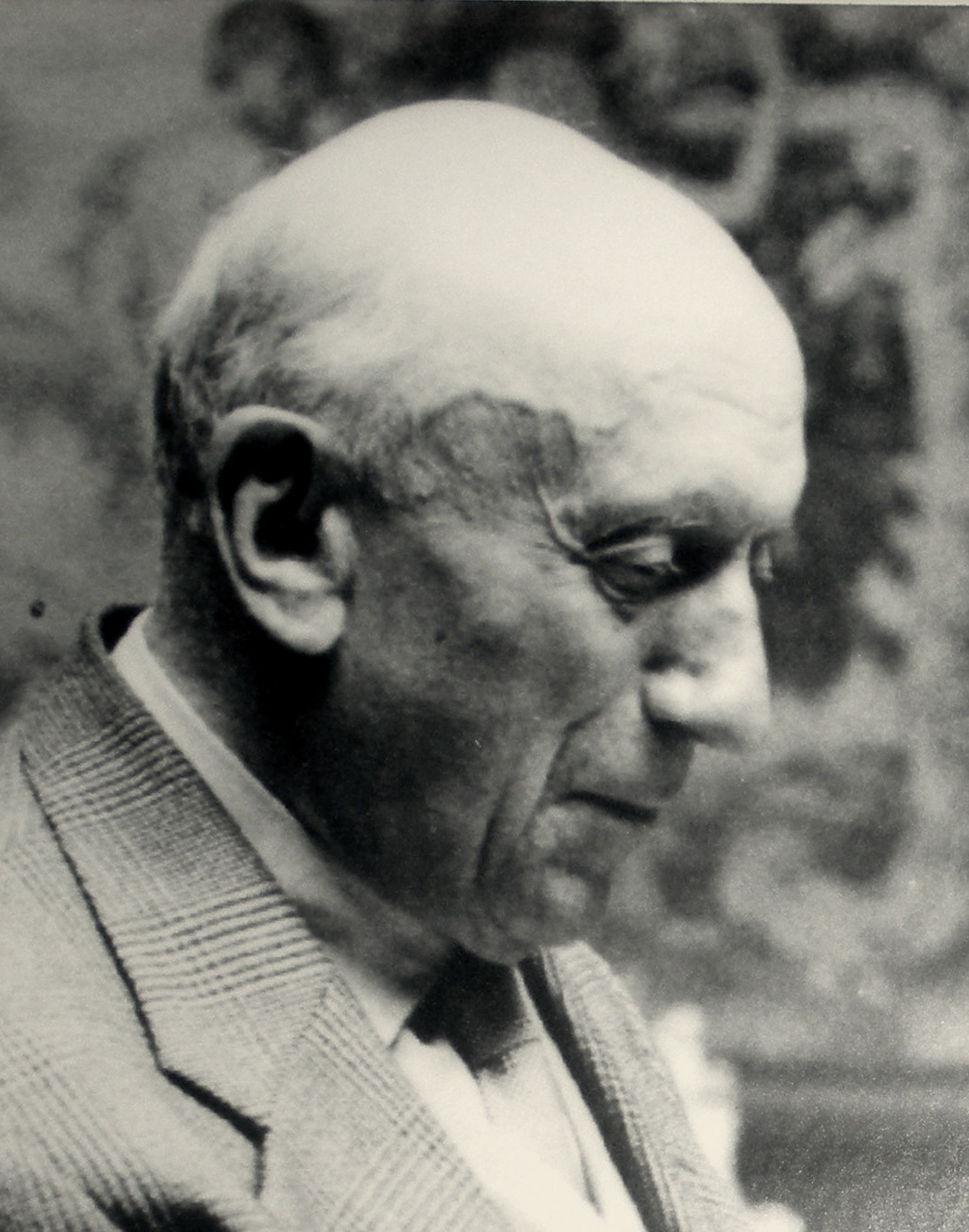
- Born: Christian Ludvig David; 30 July 1878; Copenhagen, Denmark
- Died: 18 April 1960 (aged 81); Copenhagen, Denmark
- Education: University of Copenhagen
- Occupations: Lawyer, businessman, art collector
- Known for: Lawyer, ISS A/S
- Board member of: Various including De Forenede Vagtselskaber

Christian Ludvig David (30 July 1878 – 18 April 1960) was a Danish lawyer and businessman. Key in defining the global scale of the world's largest facilities management company ISS A/S. His private art collection, The David Collection, based in two early-19th-century buildings in Kronprinsessegade in Copenhagen, was already opened to the public during his own life time. He is also remembered for presenting his lakeside summer residence Marienborg to the state as a summer retreat for the prime ministers of Denmark.

== Early life and education ==
The only son of Magdalene Juliane née Hagen (1840–1901) and Johannes Hage Christian David, a railway engineer (1837–1890), David and his two younger sisters were born into a well-to-do family in Copenhagen. Their great-grandfather was Joseph Nathan David (1758–1830), a Jewish wholesaler whose fortune had enabled his son Christian Georg Nathan David (1793–1874) to study to be an economist. Christian David converted to Christianity and became a member of the constitutional assembly, serving as Danish Minister of Finance between 1864 and 1865.

This stable financial background enabled David and his sisters to survive the early deaths of their parents. Schooled at the Metropolitanskolen (English: Metropolitan School), he received a degree in law from the University of Copenhagen in 1903.

== Career ==
=== Law career ===
On graduation, David became a practicing attorney, focusing on litigation. At the early age of 33, he was granted the right to plead cases before the Danish Supreme Court.

David made a name for himself with his defense of Emil Glückstadt (1875–1923), director of Landmandsbanken, which went bankrupt in 1922, causing Denmark's then biggest financial scandal.

For his services to Danish law, he was awarded the Dannebrogordenens Hæderstegn.

=== Business career ===
Due to his legal expertise, David became either advisor or board member of several of the day's leading Danish companies, including the Gyldendal publishing company and the Royal Copenhagen Porcelain Manufactory. This allowed him to either invest knowledgeably or negotiate a remuneration package that was in part paid in shares. It was this aspect of his life that was far more profitable than his legal career.

David's most rewarding investment was in a security company, De Forenede Vagtselskaber. Under his chairmanship, the company developed its services and footprint outside of Denmark to enable it to become the global facilities management company of today, ISS A/S. Invited to invest post World War I, in the inter-war period David became chairman and drove the company forward by acquiring security companies in Norway and Sweden. In 1934, a cleaning company, Det Danske Rengøringsselskab, was spawned from an idea from the then CEO. The primary service of security was provided as a person on location. So in a change of operations, instead of just watching the building, the "guard" also cleaned it. In this way two services were offered at the same time with only one employee, multiplying revenues and profits greatly.

=== World War II ===
On 9 April 1940, Nazi Germany unleashed Operation Weserübung, the invasion of Denmark. Unlike many other Nazi-occupied countries, the Danish institutions continued to function relatively normally until 1943. David was allowed to continue his daily life as lawyer and businessman, although because of his partly Jewish heritage, he came under attack from Danish Nazis.

In 1943, following a series of strikes and sabotage of various strategic assets and military production facilities, the occupation authorities dissolved the Danish government. David fled to neutral Sweden, from where he continued to manage ISS on an operational and strategic level.

== Art collection ==
As a bachelor with a good income, David had started an art collection. He focused the core on fine and applied arts from the 18th century, a small group of works of art from the Islamic world based around medieval ceramics, and a collection of contemporary Danish art from the first half of the 20th century.

David had housed his collection in his two homes: a townhouse at Kronprinsessegade no. 30 in central Copenhagen and his country estate, Marienborg on Lake Bagsværd, which he bought in 1934.

On his return from Sweden, on 12 December 1945, the collection and his home in Copenhagen became an independent institution, the C. L. David Foundation and Collection. The actual opening was not until 1948, partly because David did not vacate the third floor until 1946, partly because the architect Ole Wanscher had to furnish a silver room on the same floor.

== Death and legacy ==
David died in Copenhagen on 18 April 1960. He was buried at Marienborg. At his request, the Marienborg country estate was willed to the Danish State, to be used as the summer residence of the country's prime or foreign minister. The State officially took over Marienborg in January 1962.

As he had never married or fathered children, David left his entire estate to the C. L. David Foundation and Collection. This secured the future of the art collection, and its free access to all. Since 1960, the exhibition space of the museum has increased significantly. The collections have continued to expand, particularly that of Islamic art, which is now the museum's largest collection, making it Scandinavia's largest collection of Islamic art and probably one of the most important in Europe. It now consists of 4,000 Islamic works of art, including c. 350 coins, presented in 20 sections divided chronologically. There are three special galleries, which concentrate on Islamic miniatures, calligraphy, and textiles.
