= The David Collection =

- Davids Samling
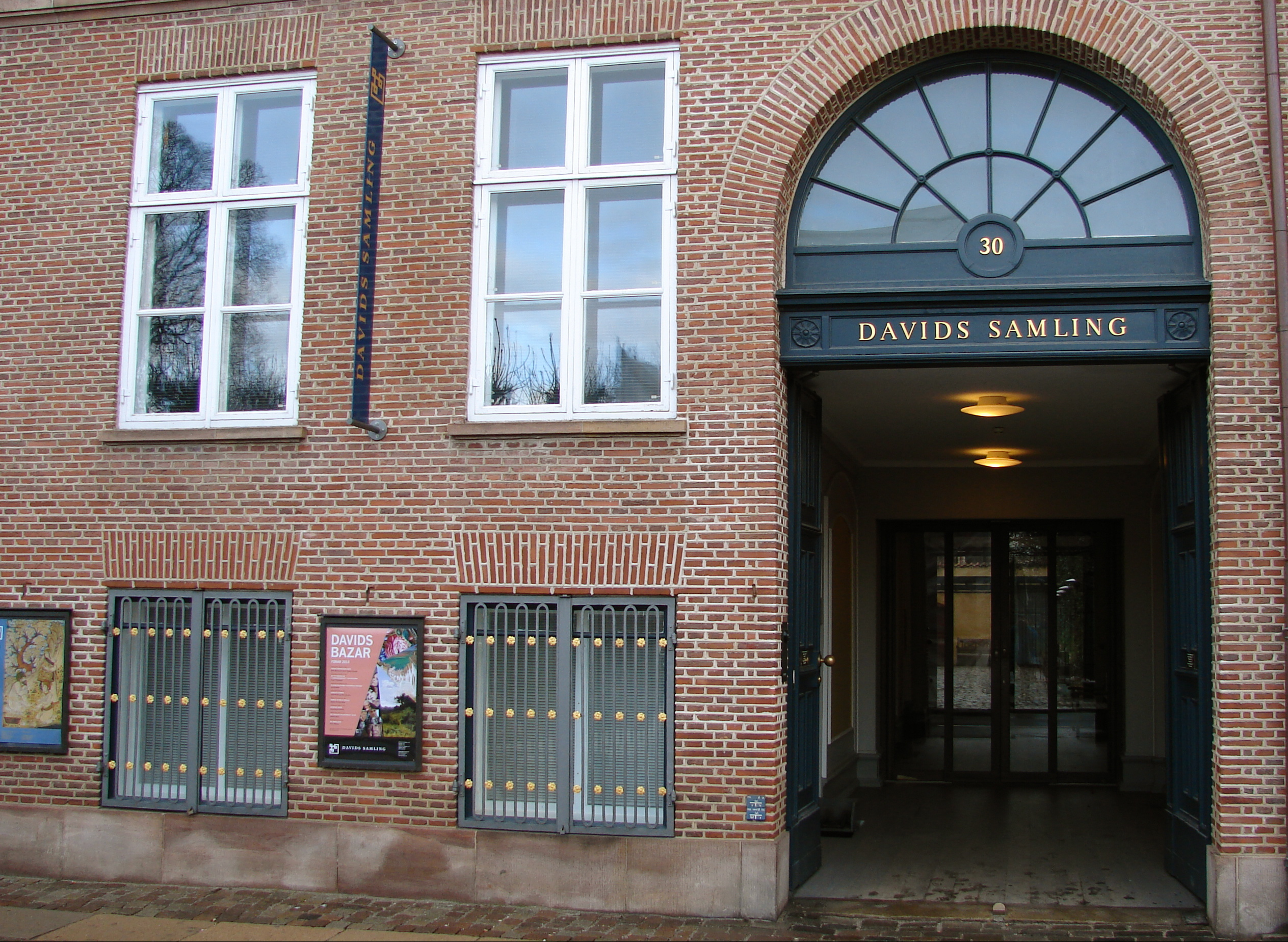
- Established: 1948
- Location: Copenhagen, Denmark
- Coordinates: 55°41′3.2″N 12°34′56.4″E
- Type: Art museum
- Visitors: 44.258 (2014)
- Founder: C.L. David
- Director: Kjeld von Folsach
- Owner: The C. L. David Foundation and Collection
- Website: www.davidmus.dk/en

The David Collection (Danish: Davids Samling) is a museum of fine and applied art in Copenhagen, Denmark, built around the private collections of lawyer, businessman and art collector C. L. David. The building at Kronprinsessegade 30 which houses the museum used to be the private home of the founder and was originally bought in 1810 by his great-grandfather, C. N. David, but sold again in 1830. In 1917 it was re-acquired by C. L. David, who took up residence in it but also made his collection available to the public at the upper floors of the building. Admission is free.

The museum is particularly noted for its collection of Islamic art from the 8th to the 19th century, which is one of the largest in Northern Europe. The museum also holds fine and applied art from Europe in the 18th century and the Danish Golden Age as well as a small collection of Danish early modern art. All the works of art in the collection of Danish early modern art were acquired by C. L. David himself.

From 2006 to 2009 the collection was closed to the public while the premises underwent a major refurbishment and rearrangement. When it reopened on 15 May 2009, it was described as "the most exclusive museum in Denmark" in national Danish newspaper Politiken.

== History ==
In 1917, David re-acquired the building that had once belonged to his grandfather. He took up residence in it but also made his collection available to the public on the upper floors of the building.

On 12 December 1945, the collection, along with the building which houses it, became the independent institution the C. L. David Foundation and Collection, and the museum opened in 1948. Over the years, the exhibition space was continuously expanded and rebuilt as the collections grew. In 1960, on the death of its founder, the foundation became the sole heir to his fortune.

In 1986, the foundation acquired the adjacent property, 32 Kronprinsessegade, where the architect Vilhelm Wohlert, also known for the design of Louisiana Museum of Modern Art, designed a whole new gallery for the expanding collection of Islamic miniatures in 1990.

Further rebuildings have gradually included more rooms and improved facilities. In 2006 the museum was temporarily closed to the public when it embarked on a major refurbishment and rearrangement of the collections. It reopened on 15 May 2009.

The architect Carl Petersen was responsible for the first rebuilding of the top floor, where the roof was given a steeper pitch so as to create adequate space for two large, skylighted rooms. This rebuilding was completed around 1920.

Part of the top floor was made into three rooms, finished in neo-classical style with partly coffered ceilings, tall panels, and patterned parquet floors. Two of the rooms also had skylights since these rooms were used as galleries. The woodwork still attracts much attention. The wood comes from the King Christian VI's dock, which was broken up in 1918. The darker or lighter colour of the oak depends on the time it has spent in the water.

In 1928, the architect Kaare Klint designed two exhibition rooms for the growing collection of porcelain. The walls are covered with Douglas fir and the exhibition cases were manufactured in Rudolf Rasmussen's workshop. The rooms and the exhibition cases are still in use, but now exclusively for the Islamic collection.

The most recent rebuilding of the museum, lasting until 15 May 2009, was undertaken by Wohlert Arkitekter.

== Collections ==
The collection is most noted for its collection of Islamic art and contains works from almost the entire Islamic cultural sphere, from Spain in the West to India in the East and dating from the 7th to the 19th centuries.

The European and Danish collections include:

- Furniture (Chippendale, works by David Roentgen)
- Porcelain (including early Meissen porcelain) and faience
- Silverware
- Sculptures, and ceramics made by Danish artists between c. 1880 and 1950

and paintings by:

- Peder Als
- Jan Asselyn
- François Boucher
- Poul S. Christiansen
- Pieter Claesz
- Cornelis Gerritsz Decker
- C. W. Eckersberg
- Vigilius Eriksen
- Jean Gaugain
- Albert Gottschalk
- Jan Hackaert
- Vilhelm Hammershøi
- Constantin Hansen
- Peter Hansen
- H. G. F. Holm
- Gillis van Hulsdonck
- Jens Juel
- P. S. Krøyer
- Christen Købke
- Johannes Larsen
- Johan Thomas Lundbye
- Agnes Cathinka Wilhelmine Lunn
- J. P . Møller
- Julius Paulsen
- Jean-Baptiste Perronneau
- Theodor Philipsen
- Svend Rathsack
- Jan Antonisz. van Ravesteyn
- Jacques Saly
- Joakim Skovgaard
- Niels Skovgaard
- P. C. Skovgaard
- Fritz Syberg
- David Teniers II
- Hendrik Cornelisz van Vliet
- Jan Weenix
- Jens Ferdinand Willumsen
