= Werner Hans Rudolph Rosenkrantz Giedde =

Danish composer

Werner Hans Rudolph Rosenkrantz Giedde (4 October 1756 – 1816) was a Danish composer, music collector and Royal official.

A catalogue of his music is in the Royal Library of Copenhagen. His work includes piano music and psalm settings.

He was also a collector of music by Italian composers.

Alongside his musical interests, he served as a page and later official Chamberlain to Juliana Maria of Brunswick-Wolfenbüttel.

== See also ==
- List of Danish composers
