= Christianelyst =

Listed house in Denmark

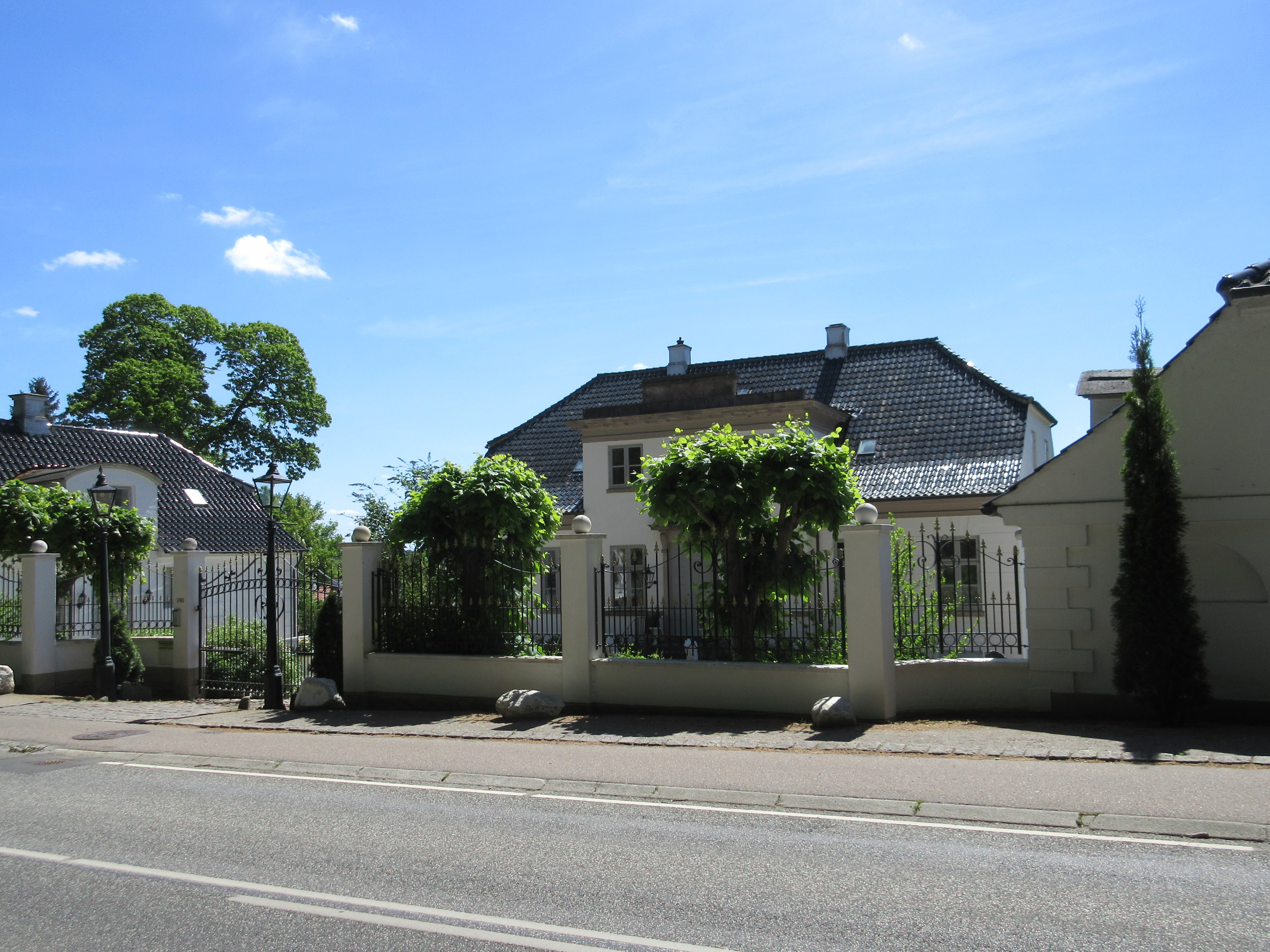
- Christianelyst seen from Nybrovej
- Interactive map of the Christianelyst area

General information
- Architectural style: Neoclassical
- Location: Nybrovej 393; 2800 Kongens Lyngby, Denmark
- Coordinates: 55°46′31.62″N 12°27′40.68″E
- Completed: 1803
- Client: Carl Ludwig Drewsen

Christianelyst is a listed house situated on the northern shore of Bagsværd Lake in the northern suburbs of Copenhagen, Denmark. The Neoclassical property consists of a main wing and two side wings surrounding three sides of a courtyard which is open to the north. The garden to the south of the house slopes down towards the lake.

== History ==
Christianelyst is the last of several properties which were sold off from the Frederiksdal estate from the middle of the 18th century and used for the construction of country houses. They were collectively referred to as Ny Frederiksdal (New Frederiksdal) and also comprised Søro and Tusculum.

Christianelyst was built by Carl Ludwig Drewsen in 1803. He named the house after his wife, Christiane Louise Frederikke Buch, the daughter of the gardener at Frederiksdal House, whom he had married the previous year.

In the late 19th century, Ferdinand Meldahl added pergolas between the main wing and its two side wings but they have later been removed. The house was refurbished in 1988–89.

== Architecture ==
The main building is a two-storey building with a half-hipped, black-glazed tile roof. The house has an area of 614 square metres plus a 212 square metre cellar. It stands on a 12,000 square metre property.

== Today ==
The property is now owned by the company Naturen Partner ApS which is based at the site. In August 2017, Chritianelyst was put on the market with a price tag of DKK 68 million.

== Cultural references ==
In the 1948 film I de lyse nætter, Christianelyst was used as the house where Linda Strand (Tove Maës) lives.
