= William Duntzfelt =

Danish merchant and ship-owner

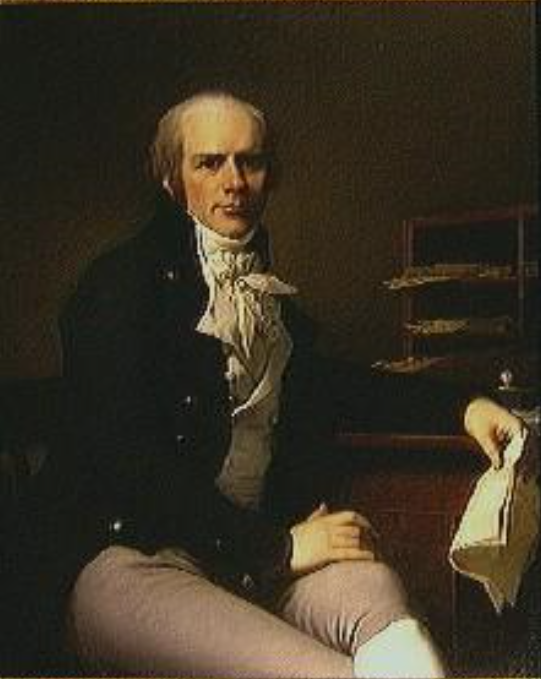
- Vilhelm Duntzfelt painted by Jens Juel in c. 1800
- Born: Christian Vilhelm Duntzfelt; 9 September 1762; Negapatnam, Dutch Coromandel, India
- Died: 20 October 1809 (aged 47); Paris, France
- Burial place: Père Lachaise
- Occupations: Merchant, banker and ship-owner

William Duntzfelt (8 September 1762 – 20 October 1809) was a Danish merchant and ship-owner.

== Early life ==
Duntzfelt was born on 1762 in Negapatnam, then the capital of the Dutch Coromandel, to Johann Friedrich Düntzfeld (1725–1785), an engineer lieutenant in the Dutch East India Company, and Anna Abigael Krøckel. Duntzfelt's father left his wife and son when Duntzfelt was just two years old. A relative, Ole Bie, took care of the boy and secured him a position the Danish Indian trading posts first as a reserve assistant in Tranquebar and in 1777 as an assistant in Frederiksnagore. Over the years he was promoted through the ranks, initially in the service of the Danish Asiatic Company and later in the local government. He was also active in overseas trade between the East Indies and Europe as a partner in the firm Duntzfelt, Bloom og Kierulff.

== Career in Denmark ==
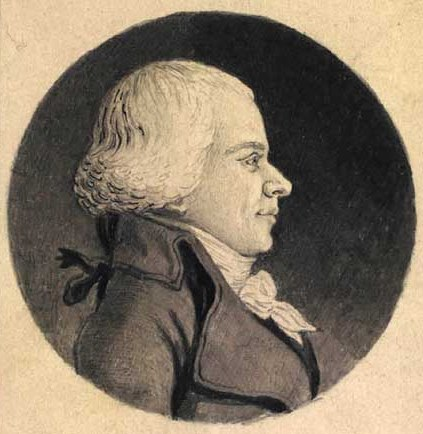
William Duntzfelt

Duntzfelt visited Denmark in 1788 and married the daughter of the wealthy merchant Frédéric de Coninck on the Dronninggård estate in July 1790. He briefly returned to Danish East India before in February 1791 settling permanently in Copenhagen. He became a managing partner in the firm Pingel, Meyer, Prætorius & Co. which had been initiated by his father-in-law in 1787 as a replacement for the Baltic African Company. Duntzfelt also established his own trading house that traded on East India. He was granted citizenship (borgerskab) as a merchant (grosserer) in 1795 and, in 1796, Duntzfelt and de Coninck decided to dissolve the consortium and transfer the activities to their personal firms. He was also active as a banker and in the market for insurances. François le Chevalier and Johannes Søbøtker joined his firm as partners in 1799 and 1804.

At the turn of the century, Duntzfelt was the largest ship-owner in the Nordic countries. He had profited immensely from Denmark's neutrality but many of his ships were still captured by English and French privateers and subsequently confiscated by court order. Duntzfelt & Co.'s losses from British confiscations alone was estimated at £144,660. He also suffered great losses during the war with England and the 1807 bombardment of Copenhagen.

Duntzfelt was a member of the managing board of Speciebanken from 1796 and of Depositokassen from 1799. He was a member of Grosserer-Societetet's governing body from 1802.

== Personal life ==
Duntzfelt owned a house in Amaliegade in Copenhagen and later the Dehn Mansion in Norgesgade. He also owned the country house Ankersminde (later Ordruphøj) in Ordrup.

He died during a visit to Paris in 1809. In spite of the great losses that he had suffered during the last decade of his career, he still died as one of the wealthiest merchants in the country.

Duntzfelt's two sons, William Frederik Duntzfelt and Frederik Duntzfelt, joined Duntzfelt & Co. after their father's death. It was declared bankrupt in 1833.
