= Frédéric de Coninck =

Dutch businessman

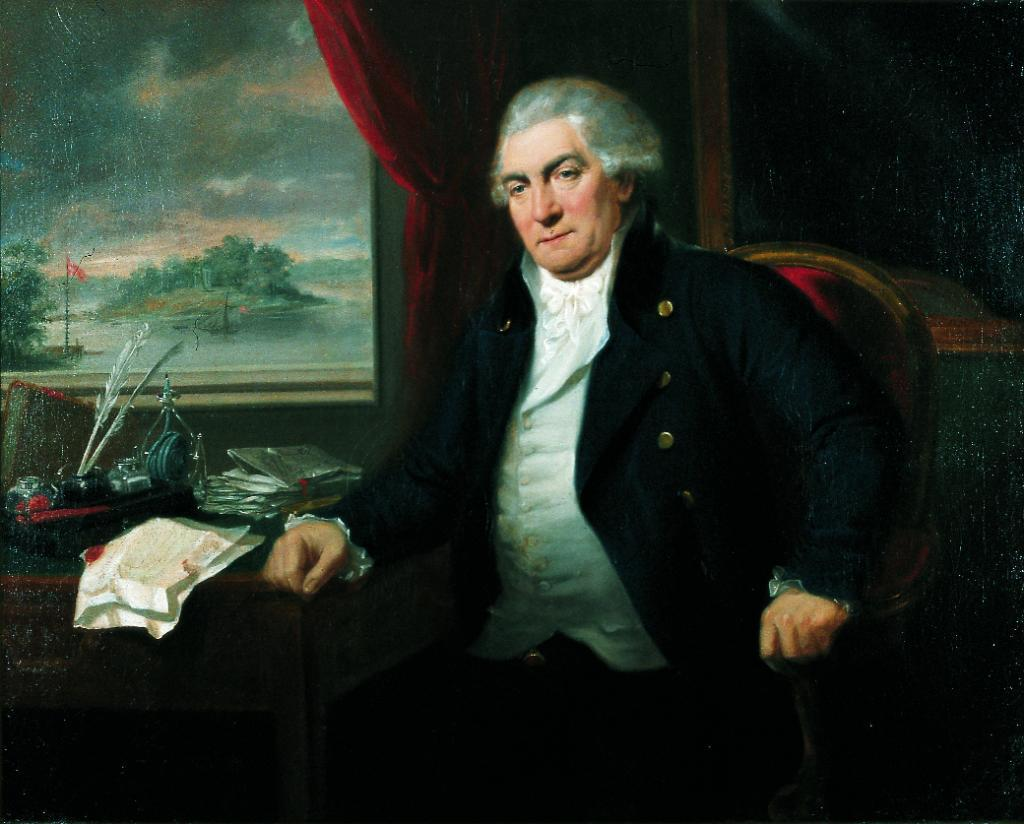
Portrait by Daniel Orme, 1799

Frédéric de Coninck (2 December 1740 – 4 September 1811) was a Dutch merchant and shipowner active in Copenhagen, Denmark.

== Biography ==
Frédéric de Coninck was born at The Hague in the Netherlands. In 1763, he moved to Copenhagen to set up a foreign trade and shipping company. He became one of Denmark's largest shipowners, with a fleet of 64 vessels at the company's height. He took advantage of Denmark's neutrality during the Napoleonic Wars to boost his and the country's trade, but his company got into difficulties during and after the English Wars, having to shut down in 1822.

== Personal life ==
In 1797, he had his residence De Coninck House built in Copenhagen. During the 1780s, he acquired the Dronninggaard estate at Holte and engaged the architect Andreas Kirkerup to design a manor house at which he died during 1811. His daughter Marie Henriette de Coninck (1774–1843) married Danish merchant William Duntzfelt (1762-1809). Their daughter Cécile Olivia Duntzfelt (1798-1863) was the mother of Danish-born American doctor Henry Jacques Garrigues (1831–1913).

== de Coninck ships ==
- Hussaren
