= De Coninck House =

- De Conincks Gård
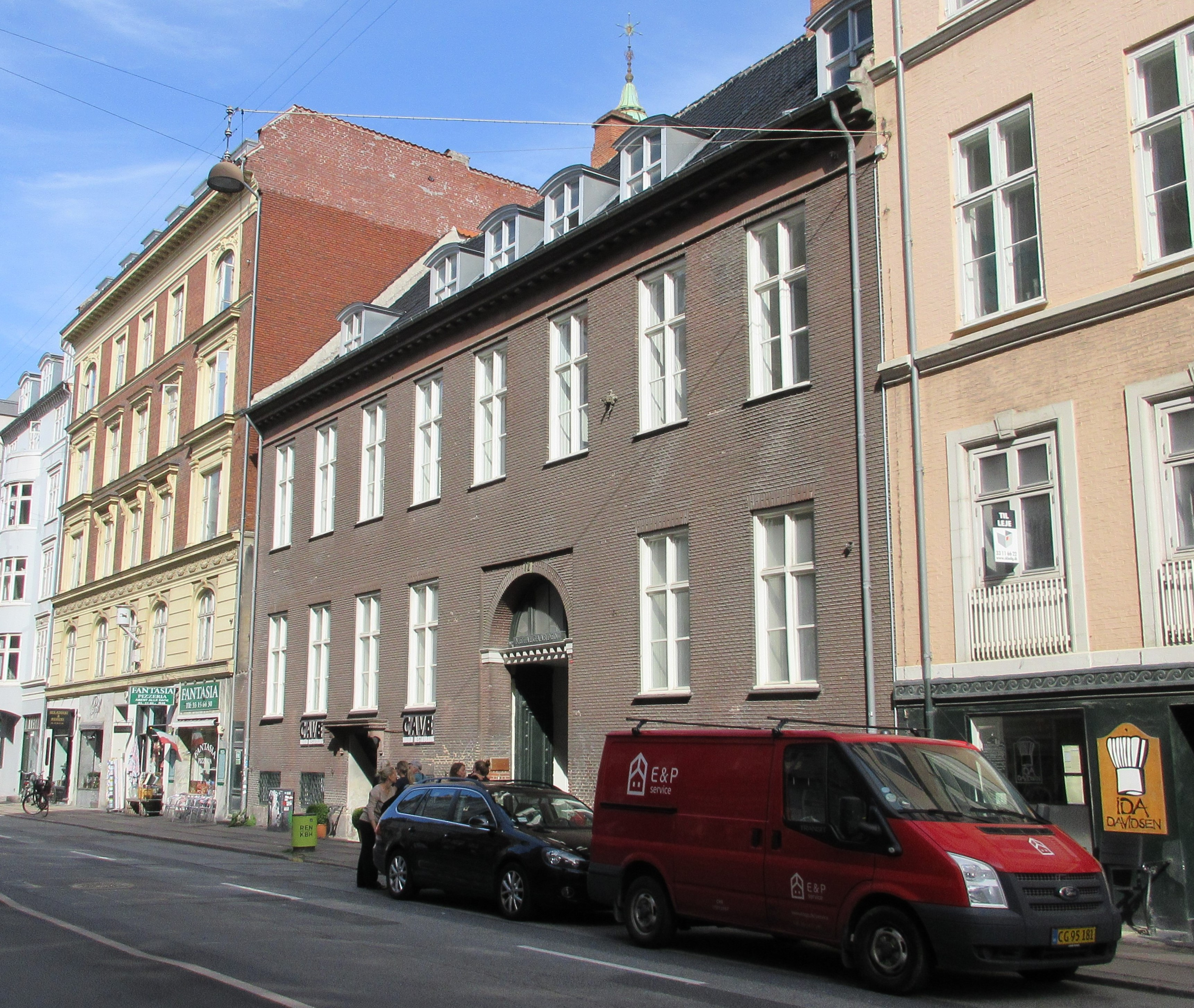
- Interactive map of the De Coninck House area

General information
- Location: Copenhagen, Denmark
- Coordinates: 55°40′58.38″N 12°35′27.6″E
- Completed: 1797
- Client: Frédéric de Coninck

Design and construction
- Architect: Andreas Kirkerup (attributed)

The De Coninck House (Danish: De Conincks Gård) is a historic property located at Store Kongensgade 72 in central Copenhagen, Denmark. It takes its name after Frédéric de Coninck for whom it was built in the 1790s.

== History ==
=== Frédéric and Louis de Coninck ===
The building is situated in the former garden of the Moltke Mansion in Dronningens Tværgade. In the 1780s the building now known as the Moltke Mansion after a later owner was acquired by merchants and ship-owners Frédéric de Coninck and Niels Reiersen. Reiersen withdrew from the partnership when he succeeded his father as the proprietor of the Royal Silk Manufactory in Bredgade. In 1792, Coninck let the mansion in Dronningens Rværgade out to the Spanish envoy. In 1794, he sold it to queen dowager Juliana Maria, who had been left homeless by the fire of Christiansborg Palace, but kept a piece of the garden towards Store Kongensgade.

The renderings for Coninck's building at No. 72 (then Parcel No. 209) were approved on 23 January 1797. The design has traditionally been attributed to Joseph-Jacques Ramée by Danish sources but this has been questioned by French, German and American researchers. Ida Haugsted suggests that the architect was more likely Andreas Kirkerup. The building was completed in 1798.

The building contained a two-storey, 13-room apartment in the left side and two apartments in the right side. The large apartment was in 1801 occupied by Coninck's daughter Louise Philippine (1775-1851) and her husband Jean Monod (1765-1836). He was pastor at the French Reformed Church and they had therefore until then resided in the church's rectory in the street Åbenrå. The couple shared the apartment with their four children, Monod's sister Betsi Monod, one servant and three maids.

The building was after Coninck's death in 1709 passed down to his son Louis Coninck. He resided in the building for a few years.

Louis de Coninck was in 1814 granted permission to go on a three-year trade expedition to Lisbon and the Mediterranean Sea on board the brig Marie. He therefore chose to sell the house in Store Kongensgade to fellow naval officer Christoph Johan Friderich Hedemann (1786-1826).

=== Christian Fenger ===
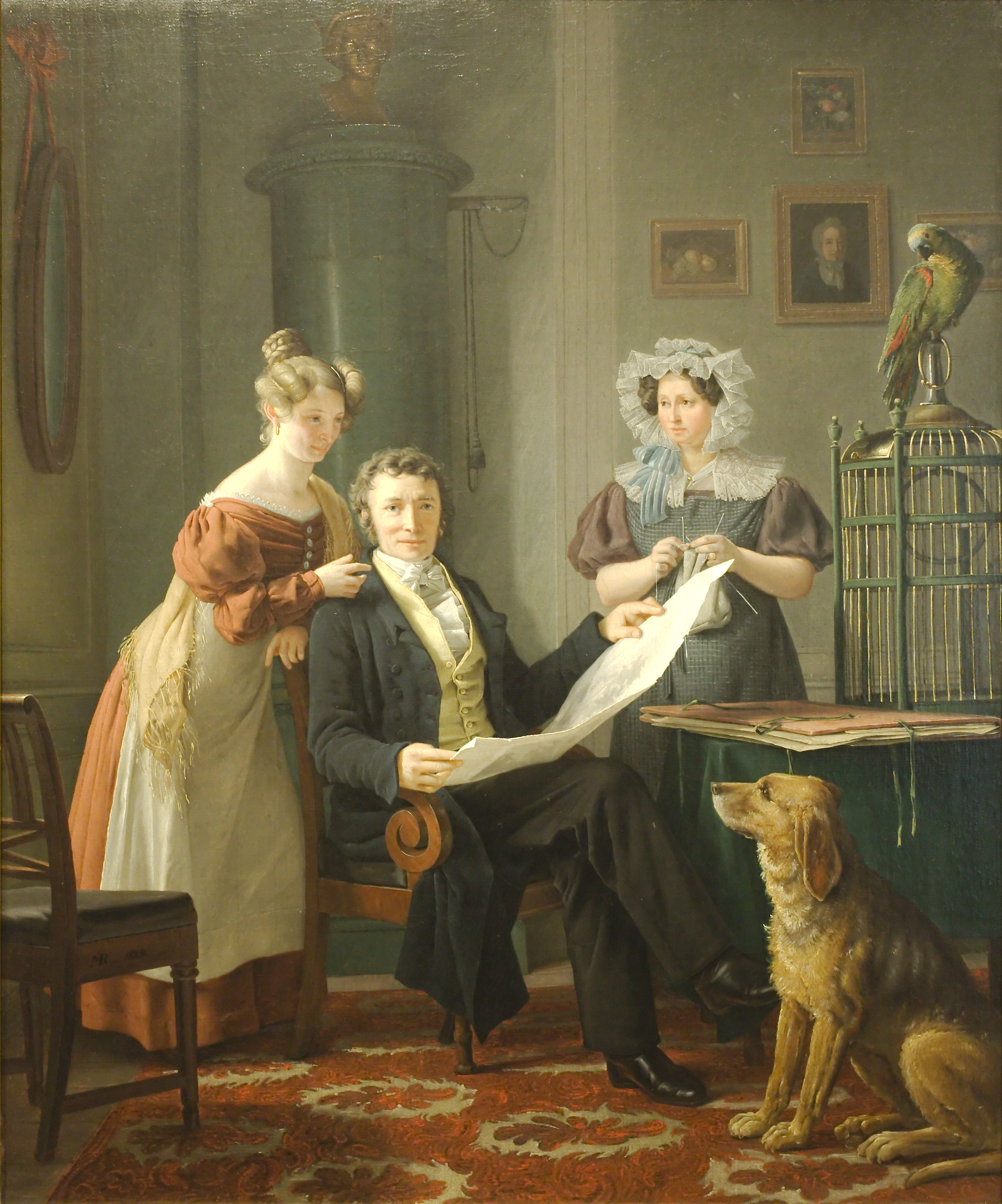
Nartinus Rørbye (1829): Christian Fenger with his wife and daughter in the house in Store Kongensgade. He is holding the drawings for the adaption of the building in his hand.

In 1815, Hedemann sold the building to the surgeon Christian Fenger. In the 1820s, Fenger divided the large apartment in the left side of the building into two separate apartments. He resided with his wife Christian Fenger (1773-1845) and their daughter Rlse Sophie in the apartment on the first floor.

The ground floor apartment to the left was at the time of the 1834 census occupied by first lieutenant Georg Beresford Christmas (1800-1867) and his wife Augusta Christine Kortright (1809-1865) and Anna Kortright (1810-), two daughters of Cornelius Hendricksen Kortright (-1818) and a merchant from Saint Croix who was living with them at the moment.

The ground floor apartment to the right was occupied by naval captain lieutenant Paul Severin Kierulf (1793-1842) and his Norwegian-born wife Marie (née Mørch, 1898–1867), their 8-year-old foster daughter Clara Perkins and two maids. The apartment on the first floor to the right was occupied by the unmarried businessman (grosserer) James Gordo (aged 52), 15-year-old Anders Bentzen and a maid.

=== The Barnekow family ===
Else Sophie Fenger was in c. 1835 married to Adolph Gothard Joachim Barnekow (1805-1839). They were at the time of the 1840 census residing in the ground floor apartment to the left. Her husband died when their son Christian Barnekow was just two years old. The family had by then for a while lived in Luz-Saint Seuveur in the hope that it would help his recovery but in vain. Else Sophie Fenger inherited the building when her father died in 1848. She then moved with her son and a maid into her parents' former apartment on the first floor to the left.

The ground floor apartment to the left was in 1855 occupied by politician Carl Frederik Simony (1806-1872), his wife Anne Sophie Faber, and their eight children. Christian Barnekow was in the 1860s residing with his wife Edele Johanne With (1832-1920) in the apartment on the first floor to the right. He inherited the building on his mother's death in 1899. His son Viggo Barnekow (1872-1944), a jurist, was the last member of the Fenger-Barnekow family to own the building.

The painter Otto Bache (1839-1927) lived on the first floor from 1904 to 1921. Royal photographer Leopold Albert (1868–1949) resided in the building in the 1930s. The architect H. P. G. Koch undertook a restoration of the building in 1937.

== Architecture ==
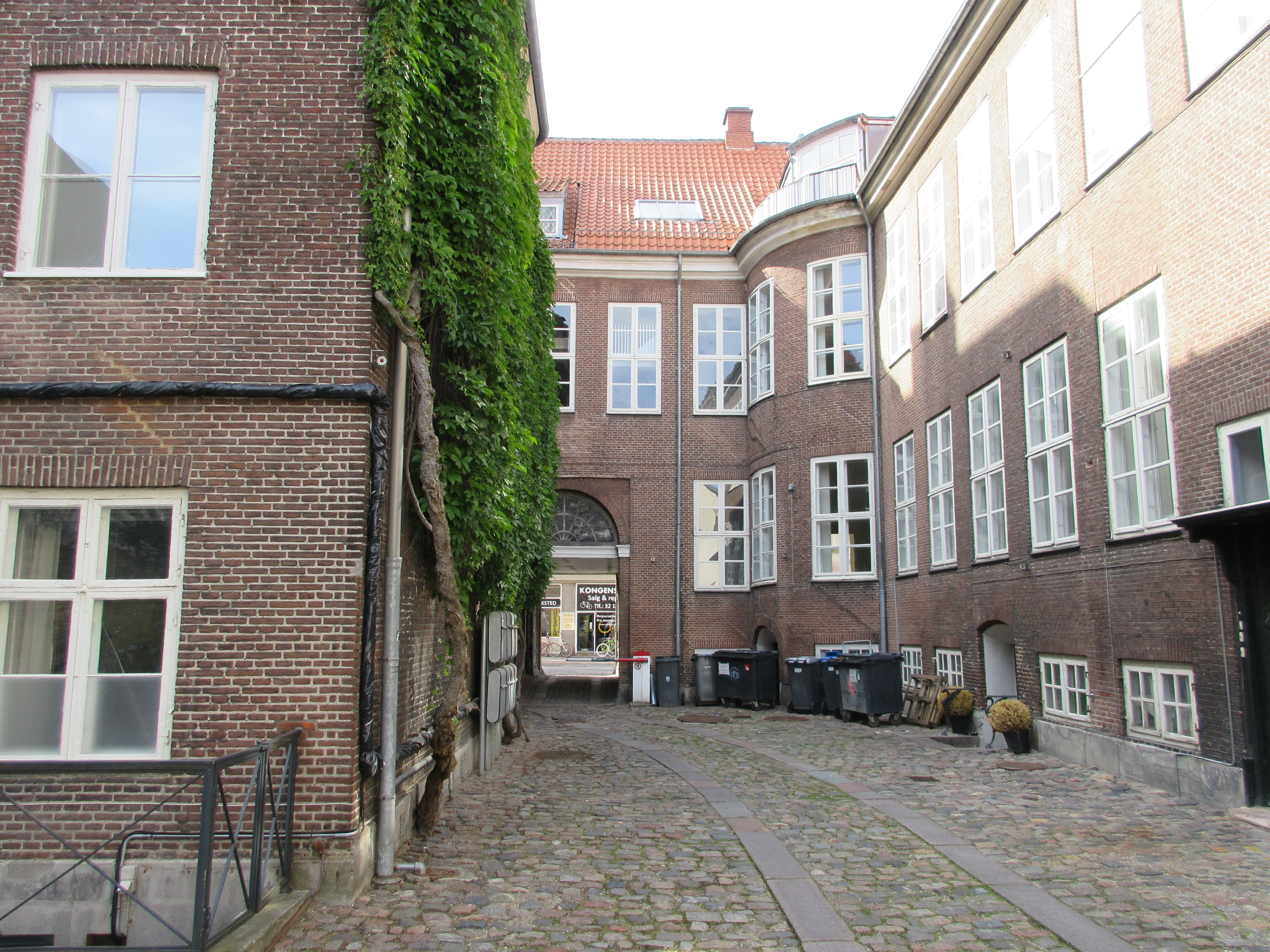
The courtyard

The building is constructed with two storeys over a walk-out basement. The front is eight bays wide. Two side wings project from the rear side of the main wing on each side of a narrow courtyard. The northern side wing is eight bays long plus a two-bay rounded connection where it meets the main wing. The shorter side connects to a three-bay rear wing. The building was listed in 1918.

== List of owners ==
- 1783-1810 Frédéric de Coninck
- 1810-1814 Louis Charles Frederik (Fritz) de Coninck
- 1814-1815 Christoph Johan Friderich Hedemann
- 1815- 1847 Christian Fenger
- 1847-1821 Else Sophie Fenger gift Barnekow
- 1899-1913 Christian Barnekow
- 1913-1921 Viggo Barnekow

== See also ==
- Næsseslottet
