= Vittskövle Church =

Church in Kristianstad Municipality, Sweden

Coordinates: 55.867°N 14.150°E

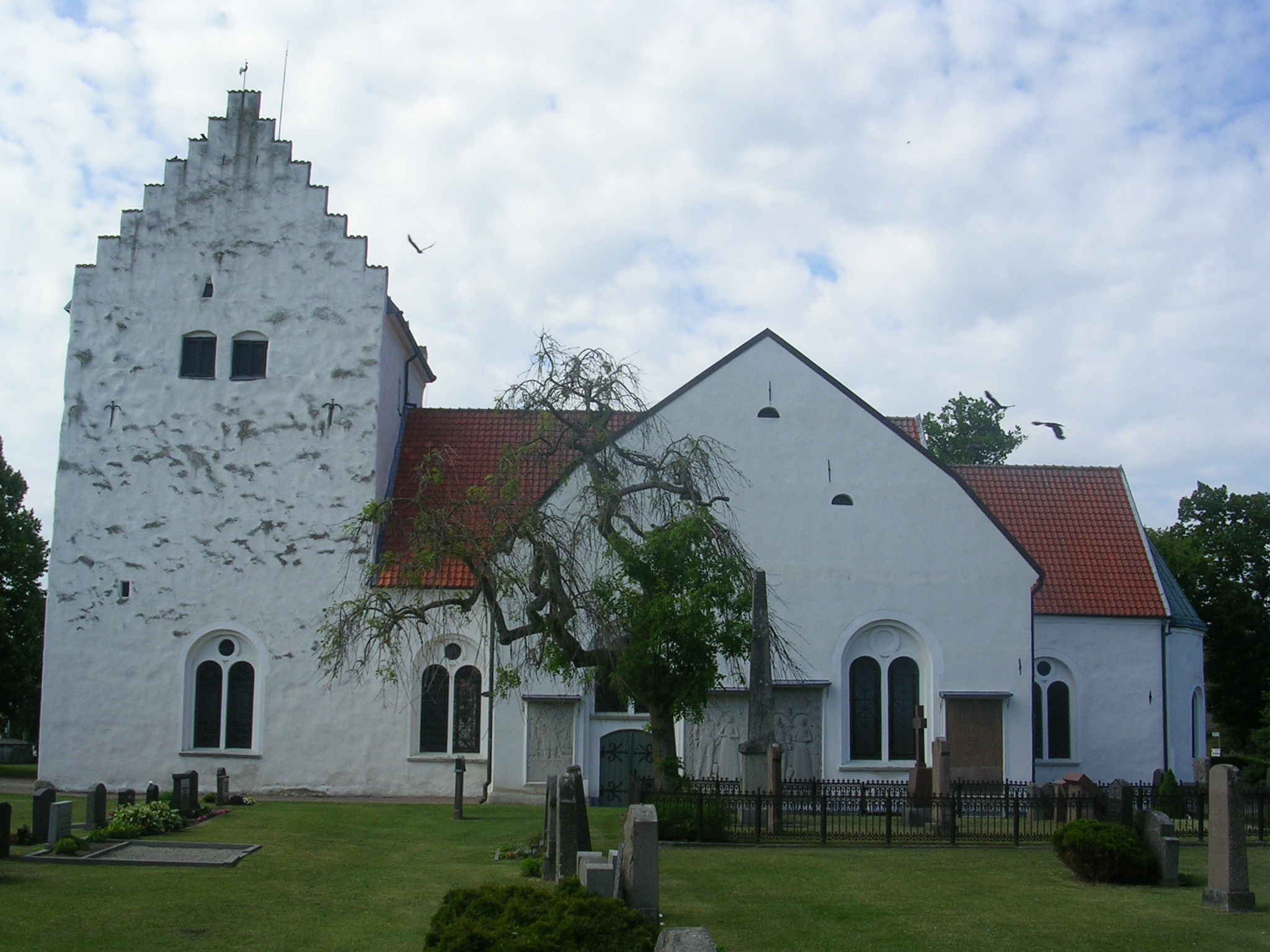
Vittskövle Church

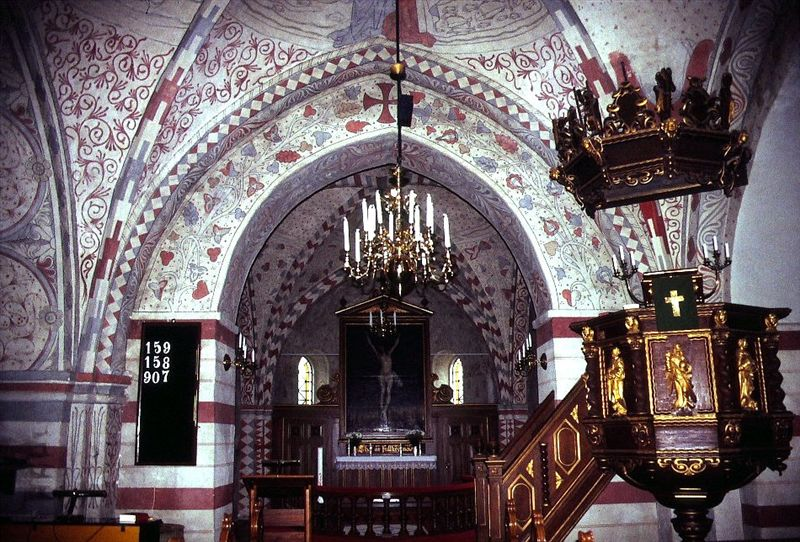
Vittskövle Church interior

Vittskövle Church (Swedish: Vittskövle kyrka) is a church in Kristianstad Municipality, in Skåne, Sweden. It is part of the Diocese of Lund.

== History ==
The oldest parts of the church are built in Romanesque style during the late 12th century or early 13th century. In the 15th century a chapel was built in the north. The chapel was dedicated to Saint Anne. The vaults were built in the 15th century with murals from the 1480s, showing stories from Genesis. These were later painted over, but again restored in the 20th century.

In the chancel, the legend of Saint Nicholas has been depicted. In Saint Anne's chapel there are the symbols of the evangelists, as well as the four female medieval saints: Saint Barbara, Saint Ursula, Saint Gertrude and Saint Catherine. The tower was built in the 16th century.

The pulpit is made of oak in 1704–1705. It is decorated with various wood sculptures and gildings. The baptismal font is from the Middle Ages and made of sandstone. In the 17th century, a grave chapel was built to the south for the members of the Barnekow family.
