= Brede House =

Country house in Denmark

- Brede Hovedbygning
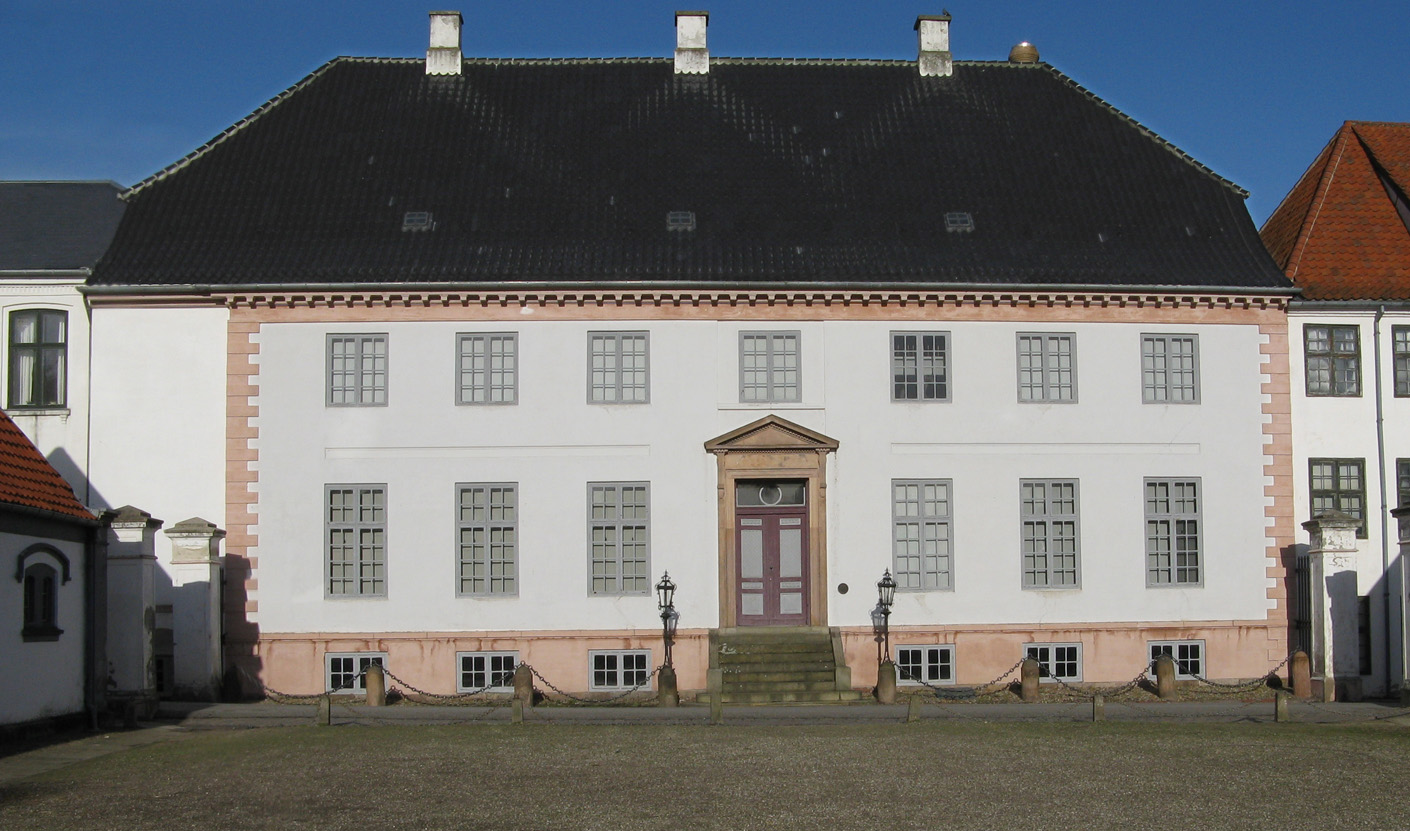
- Brede House
- Interactive map of the Brede House area

General information
- Architectural style: Neoclassical
- Location: Kongens Lyngby, Denmark
- Coordinates: 55°47′40.16″N 12°29′51.09″E
- Completed: 1795
- Client: Peter van Hemert
- Owner: National Museum of Denmark

Design and construction
- Architect: Andreas Kirkerup

Brede House (Danish: Brede Hovedbygning) is a late 18th-century country house in Kongens Lyngby north of Copenhagen, Denmark. Originally built for the owner of the adjacent Brede Works, it is now owned by the National Museum of Denmark and run as a historic house museum.

== History ==
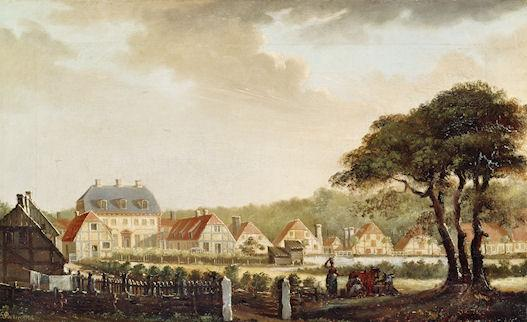
Brede House seen in a painting from 1798

Brede House was built for Peter van Hemert, the owner of Brede Works. It is believed that the architect was Andreas Kirkerup while interior designer to the Danish Court. Joseph Christian Lillie was entrusted with interior designs and probably also furnishing the house.

Van Hemert went bankrupt in 1805 and both his house and industrial plant were sold by auction.

== Museum ==
The National Museum acquired the house in 1959 and put it through a comprehensive restoration which was not completed until 1974. The Neoclassical house now serves as a historic house museum which showcases a typical upper-class home of the 1790s.

The house is now furnished with period furniture based on the detailed inventory lists prepared for each room in connection with the 1805 auction. The only furnishings that have been preserved from Hemert's home are Lille's mirrors in the garden room and banquet hall, but several other pieces of furniture which used to belong to people from the social circle he moved in Johan Joachim Pingel is also represented with a piece of furniture.

== Garden ==
The park at Brede House is situated to the rear of the building, with Brede Works to the right and a terraced slope with fruit trees to the left as seen from the main building. It was laid out in the English romantic style in connection with the construction of the house, although accounts from Brede mention gardens at the site as far back as 1783. The pavilion in Chinese style which is today seen in the garden is not native to the site, but was gifted to the National Museum in 1971. It may originally have stood in Frédéric de Coninck's romantic garden at Dronninggård. It is likely that it was designed by Kirkerup since he was the architect behind several other pavilions in Chinese style from the time, including the one in Frederiksberg Gardens.

A vegetable garden and nursery used to supply the household with fresh produce. A vegetable garden with original crops is still maintained at the far end of the park. It is situated next to the gardener's house and a small cluster of outbuildings and glasshouses, including the Grape House (Vinbakken), the Tomato House (Tomathuset), the Apple Cellar (Æblekælderen), the Orangery (Orangeriet) and the Storehouse (Materialhuset).

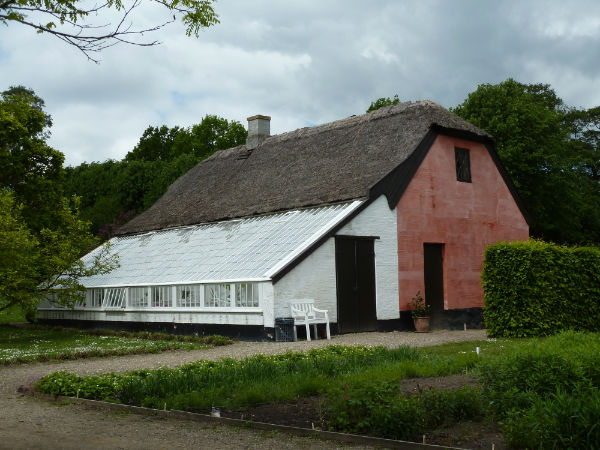
The Gardener's House with the Orangery

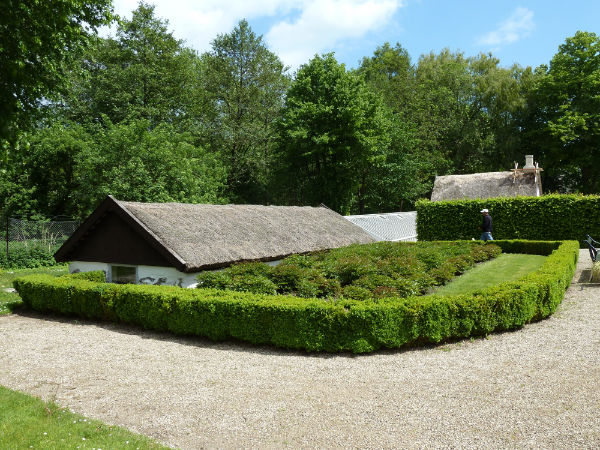
The Apple Cellar

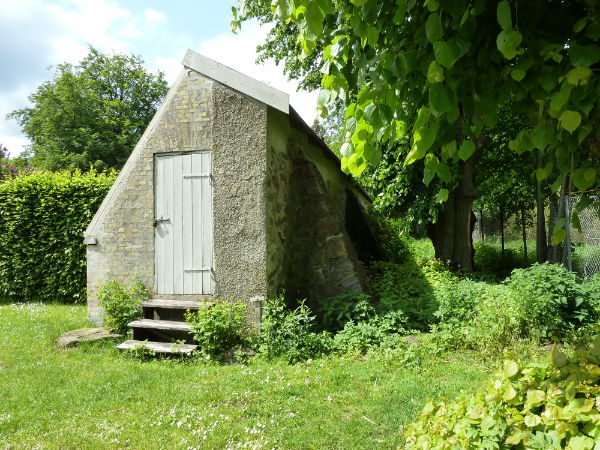
Another structure in the nursery

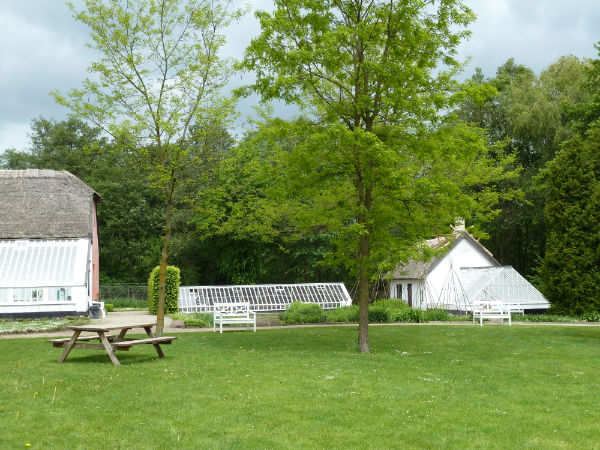
Another greenhouse and the Storehouse

== See also ==
- Frieboeshvile
