= Nikolaj Plads 23 =

Building in Copenhagen, Denmark

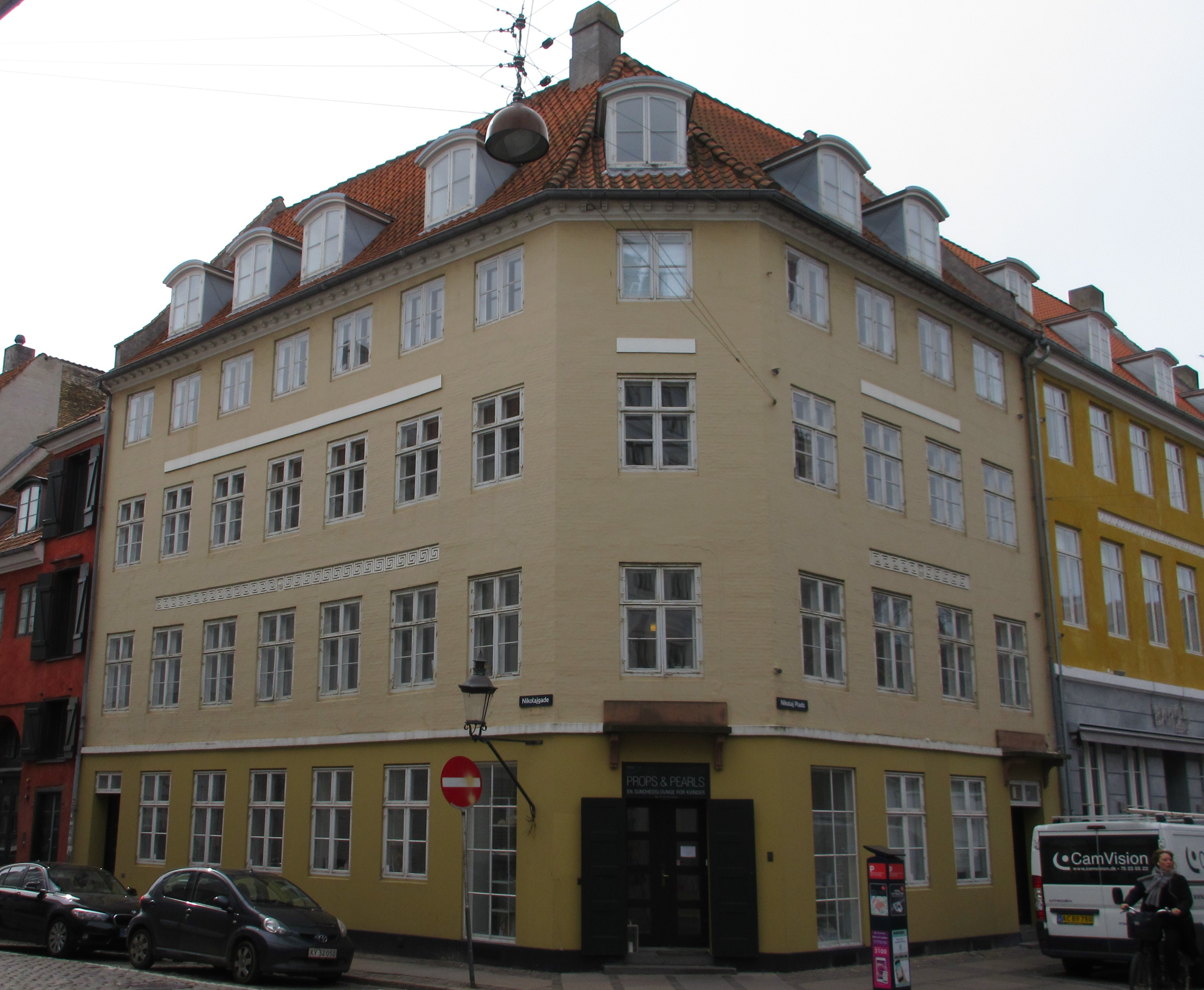
- Interactive map of the Nikolaj Plads 23 area

General information
- Architectural style: Neoclassical
- Location: Copenhagen, Denmark
- Coordinates: 55°40′41.38″N 12°34′54.37″E
- Completed: 1800

Nikolakplads 23 is a Neoclassical property situated at the corner of Nikolaj Plads and the street Nikolajgade in central Copenhagen, Denmark. It was listed in the Danish registry of protected buildings and places. The building was listed in the Danish registry of protected buildings and places in 1934. Former residents include scientific illustrator Johannes Eilert Steenfeldt, composer Rudolph Bay and playwright and theatre historian Thomas Overskou. The building is owned today by Karberghus.

== History ==
=== 18th century ===
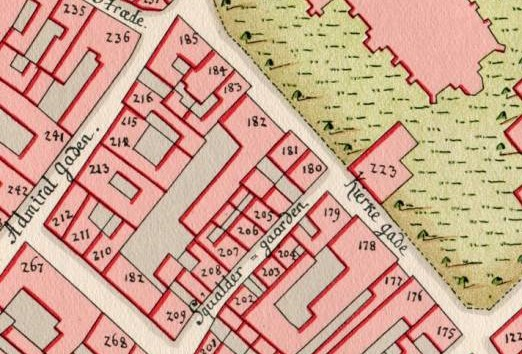
No. 180 and No. 181 etc. seen on a detail from Christian Gedde's map of the East Quarter, 1757.

In the late 17th century, the site was made up of two separate properties. The corner property was listed as No. 97 in the city's East Quarter (Øster Kvarter) owned by brewer Isak Jacobsen. The other one was listed as No. 90, owned by bargeman Ole Pedersen's widow. The two properties faced the churchyard of St. Nicolas' Church. The narrow street that separated them from the churchyard was simply referred to as Nikolaj Kirkegård (Nicolas' Graveyard). The other street (now Nikolajgade) was then known as Skvaldergade. The old No. 97 was listed as No. 180 in 1867, owned by galantry items retailer (galanterihandlende) Johan Henrik Stifken. The old No. 90 was listed as No. 181, owned by merchant (kræmmer) Jodocus Munthe.

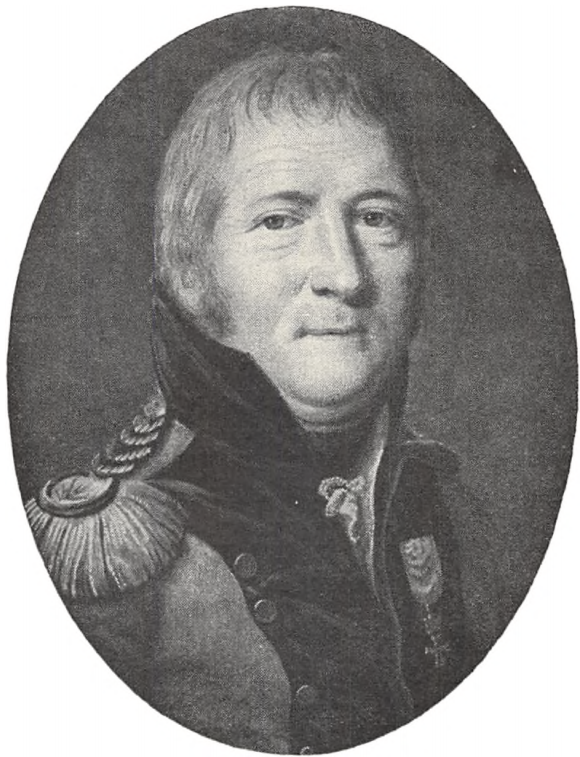
Hans Christian Schmidt

Together with St. Nikolas' Church and most of the other buildings in the area, the two properties were destroyed in the Copenhagen Fire of 1795 and subsequently merged into a single property. The current building on the site was constructed in 1800 for master joiner Johan Joachim Pingel. Pengel (1752–1819) was originally from Brandenburg, Prussia. He later moved to Copenhagen where he was granted citizenship as a master joiner in 1776. He is considered one of the finest Danish furniture makers of his time. From 1796 until 1806, Pengel was based at Østergade No. 42 and it is therefore likely that he engaged in the construction project as an investment rather than for his own use.

After the fire, Hans Christian Schmidt (1765–1826) constructed the buildings at Vingårdstræde 19 (1796–1797), Bremerholm 28/Dybensgade 14 (1797–1800) and Bremerholm 28/Dybensgade 14 (1797–1800). He was, like many of the other master craftsmen of his time, also active in the Copenhagen Fire Corps, with rank of major. His next major assignment was to adapt St. Nicolas' ruined church tower for use as a fire station and watch tower. He was appointed chief of the fire corps in 1810, prompting him to discontinue his career as an architect and master builder.

=== 19th century ===
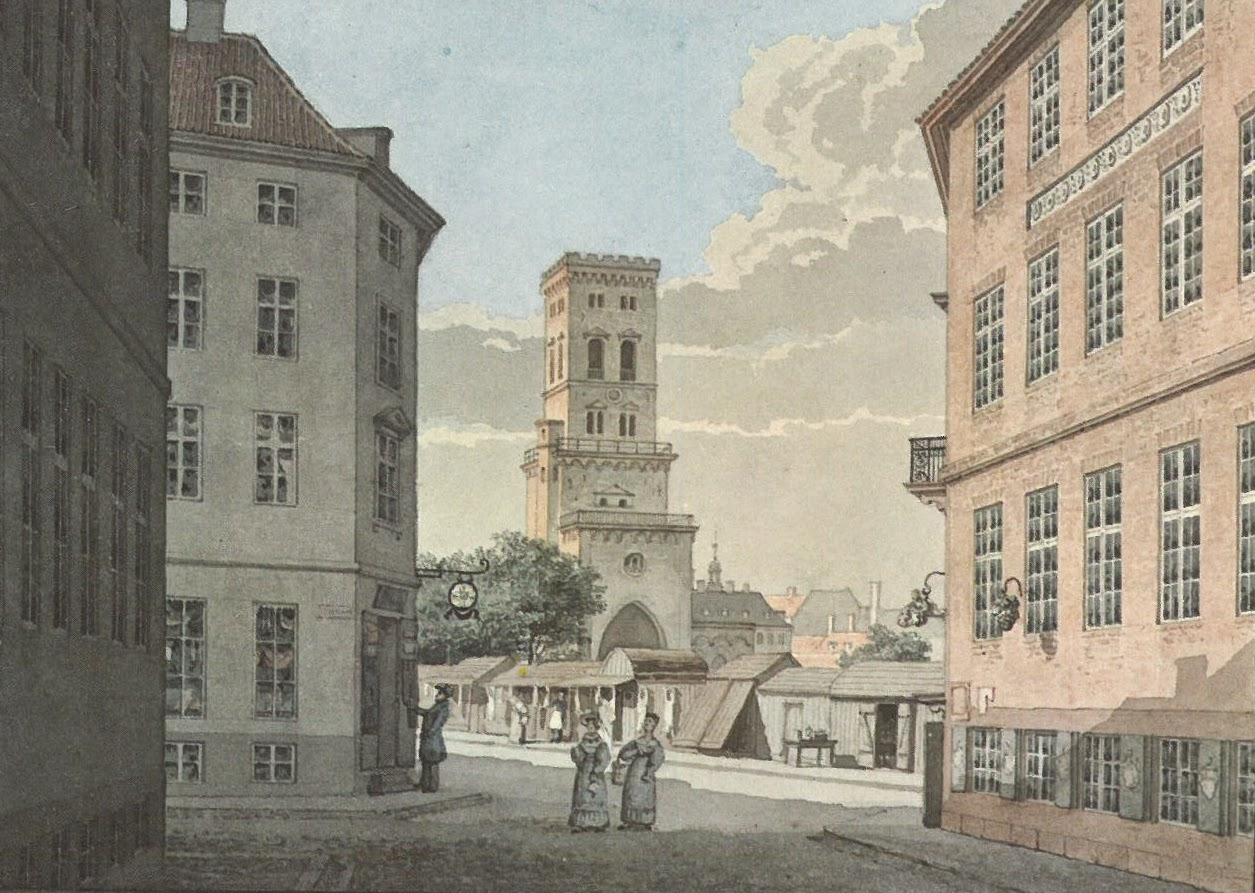
The building seen to the left on a painting by H.G.F. Holm, 1834.

At the time of the 1801 census, the property was home to a total of 36 people distributed among seven households. Pierre Lebouchiere, a language tutor, resided in the building with his wife Biene Neshie, their one-year-old son Carl Lebouchiere, the wife's 11-year-old daughter Jeannette Neshie, their maid Catrine Jørgensen, lodger Henning von Qvalen (1777–1853) and Qvalen's servant Johan Techel. Rudolph Ratenborg, a commissioner, resided in the building with his wife Kirstine Michelsen, a lodger, a servant and a maid. Hans Søemodt, a tailor, resided in the building with his wife Lycke Lange and a lodger. Carl Schinkel, a shoemaker, resided in the building with his wife Jacobine Zitsøe, their two-year-old daughter Anna Schinkel, three employees in Schinkel's shoemaker's workshop and one lodger. Christen Christensen, a gravedigger, probably associated with the adjacent cemetery, resided in the building with his wife Ingeborre Bendixen. Jens Munck, an innkeeper, resided in the building with his wife Kirstine Pedersdatter, their three children (aged two to ten) and a lodger. The last household consisted of workman Peder Olsen, his wife Ellen Larsdatter, their two children (aged two and four) and one lodger.

The property was listed as No. 145 in the new cadastre of 1806. It was owned at the time by one Glade. The church and its churchyard had not been reconstructed after the fire and the site was now used as a marketplace. The street section along the square had been incorporated into with Vingårdstræde.

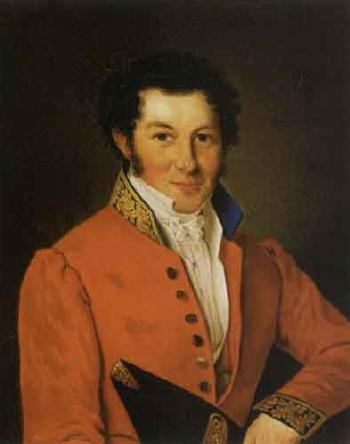
Johannes Eilert Steenfeldt by Louis Aumont

At the time of the 1840 census, the property was home to a total of 31 people. Heinrich Ahrenssen, a textile manufacturer, resided on the ground floor with his five children, four unmarried sisters-in-law and a maid. Johannes Eiler Steenfeldt (1799–1960), a draughtsman at the king's Naturalie-Cabinet, resided on the first floor with his wife Dorothea Bolette Steenfeldt, their seven-year-old son, two lodgers and a maid. One of the two lodgers was the history painter Ferdinant Helsted. Louis Dujardin, a wallpaper maker, resided on the second floor with his wife Bolette Amalia Dujardin, their four children (aged eight to 17), a 21-year-old niece and a maid. Christine Marie Lindhberg, a 58-year-old woman whose husband was absent but provided for her, shared the third floor apartment with two unmarried women, a maid and two male lodgers.

By 1845, only the tenants on the first and third floor had changed. H. C. Grehs, a master tailor, was now residing in the first-floor apartment with his wife Marie Nielsen, their five children (aged six to 16), three employees (two tailors and an apprentice) and one maid. Rasmus Nielsen, another master craftsman, resided on the third floor with his wife Catrine Nielsen and one other resident. The garret was additionally now occupied by a 44-year-old widow and her two children. Carl Gottfrid Wolgnschel, an innkeeper, resided in the basement with his wife Jacobine, seamstress Marie Severin Fredericke C. Skade, her five-year-old son Peter Vilhelm Skade and four people cared for by the Poor Authority (Fattigvæsenet).

Composer and cantor at Holmen Church Rudolph Bay (1791–1856) had been among the residents of the building for around a year in 1843–1844, but had by 1845 already moved on to an apartment in a now-demolished building at what is now Holmens Kanal 24. Writer and theatre historian Thomas Overskou (1798–1873) was among the residents from 1846 to 1848.

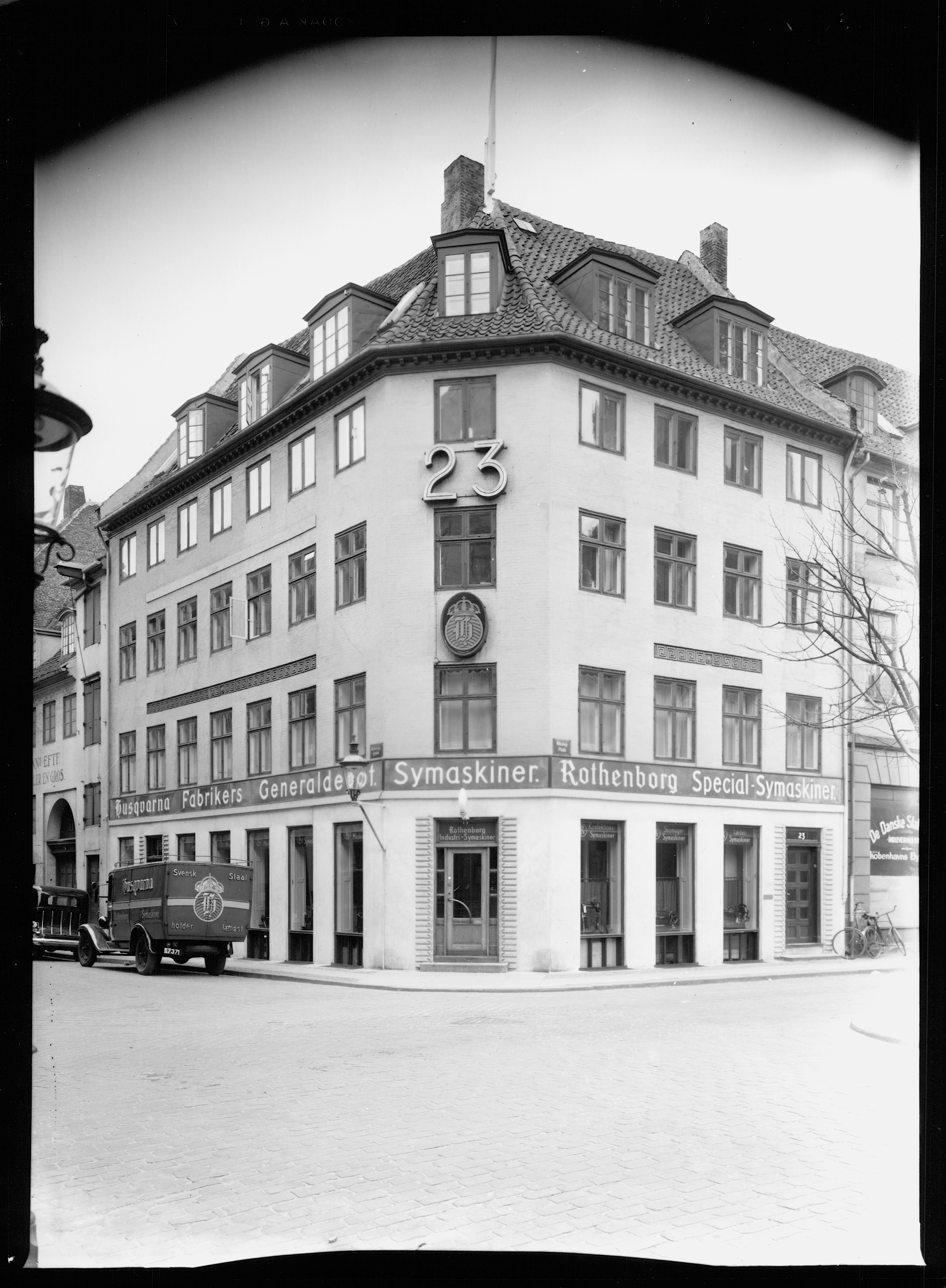
The building in 1935.

Hirsch Ahronssen, now 70 years old, was still living in the ground-floor apartment in 1850 with two of his sisters-in-law. Louis Dujardin, now in his mid-50s and with the title of court wigmaker, was also still residing on the second floor together with his wife, two children and a maid. Frederik Seerreike and Peter Engelstofte, two master tailors, both in their mid-30s, resided on the first floor. Thomas Madsen, a valet, resided on the third floor with his wife Nanny Jensine, their ten-year-old son and a maid.

=== 20th century ===
A Husqvarna shop was located in the building in the 1930s.

The building was renovated in 1945 with the assistance of architect Ole Wanscher (1903–1985). The property was restored in 1981–1982 and modernized by architects Per Kristensen and Susanne Birgens.

== Architecture ==
Nikolaj Plads 23 is a four-storey corner building with a four-bays-long facade towards Nikolaj Plads, a seven-bay-long facade towards Nikolajgade and a chamfered corner. The chamfered corner bay was dictated for all corner buildings by Jørgen Henrich Rawert's and Peter Meyn's guidelines for the rebuilding of the city after the fire so that the fire department's long ladder companies could navigate the streets more easily. The facade is plastered and painted in two shades of yellow, contrasted with white decorative details, white painted windows and green-painted doors. The transition from the darker ground floor to the paler upper floors is marked by a narrow belt course and below the roof is a modillioned cornice. Two friezes between the central windows of the three upper floors, the lower one with a Greek key pattern and the upper one blank, adorn both facades. The roof is clad with red tile.

== Today ==
The building is owned today by Karberghus. It contains commercial spaces on the three lower floors and two residential apartments on the fourth floor and in the garret.

== Gallery ==
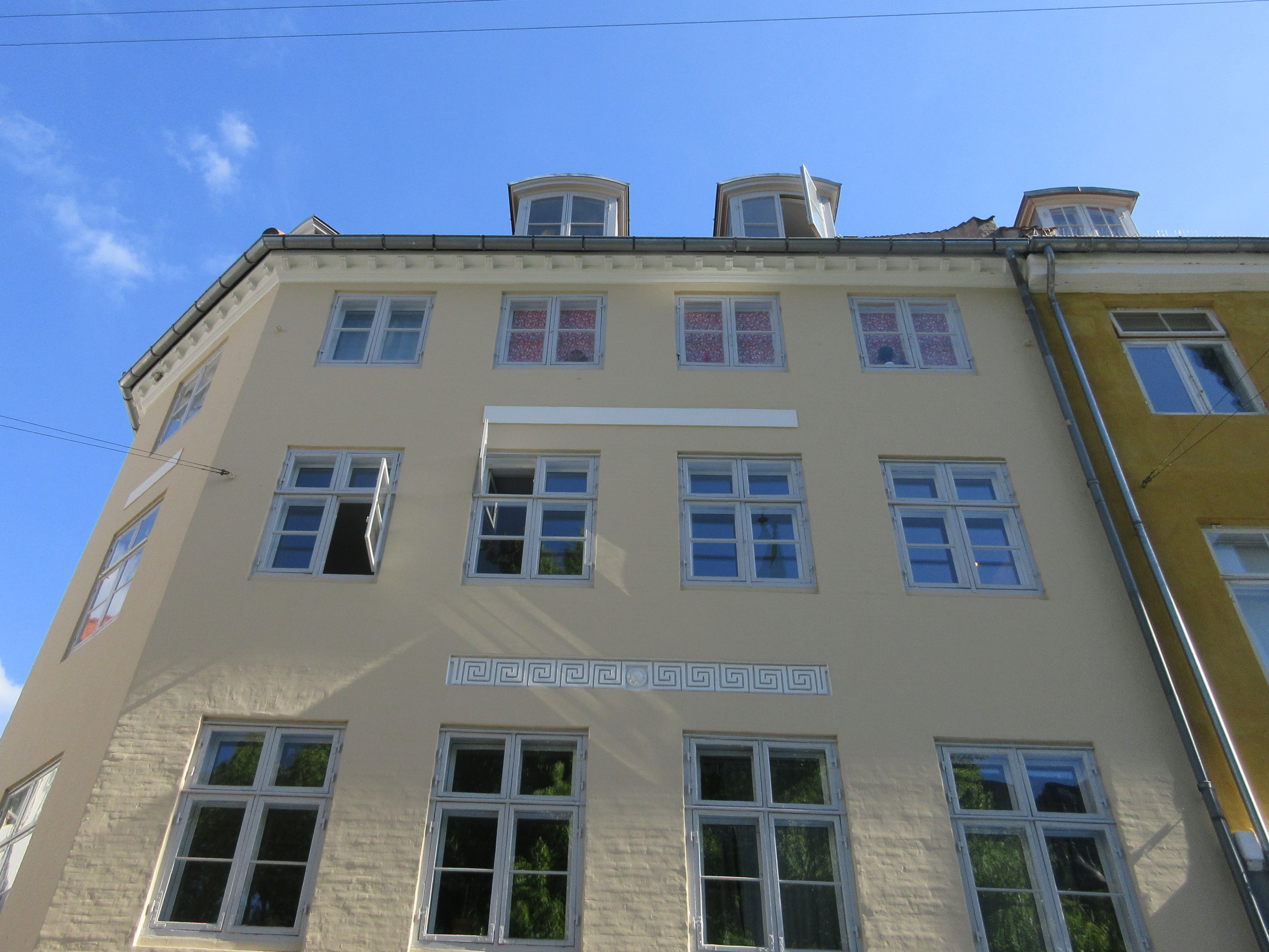
Facade detail

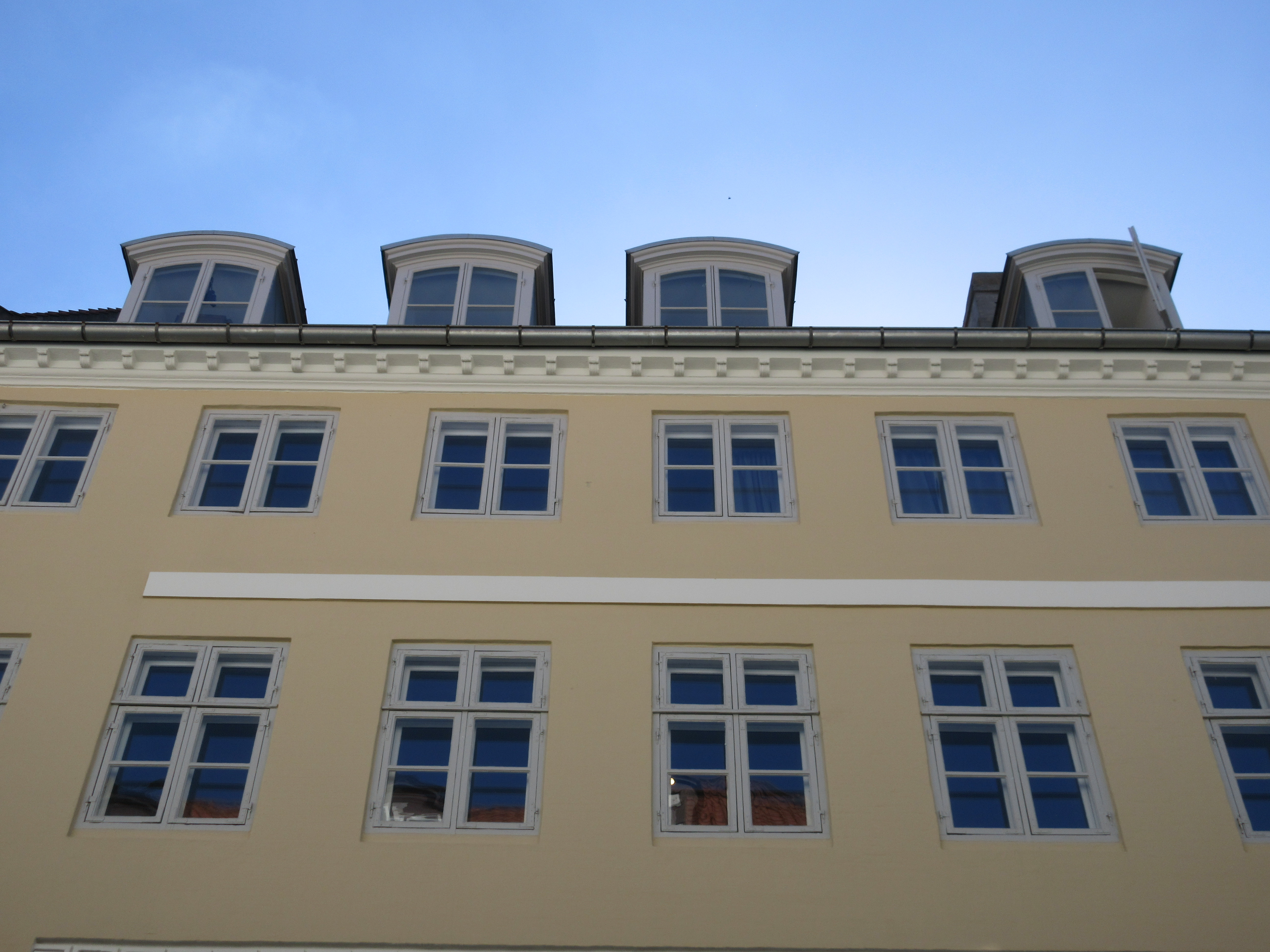

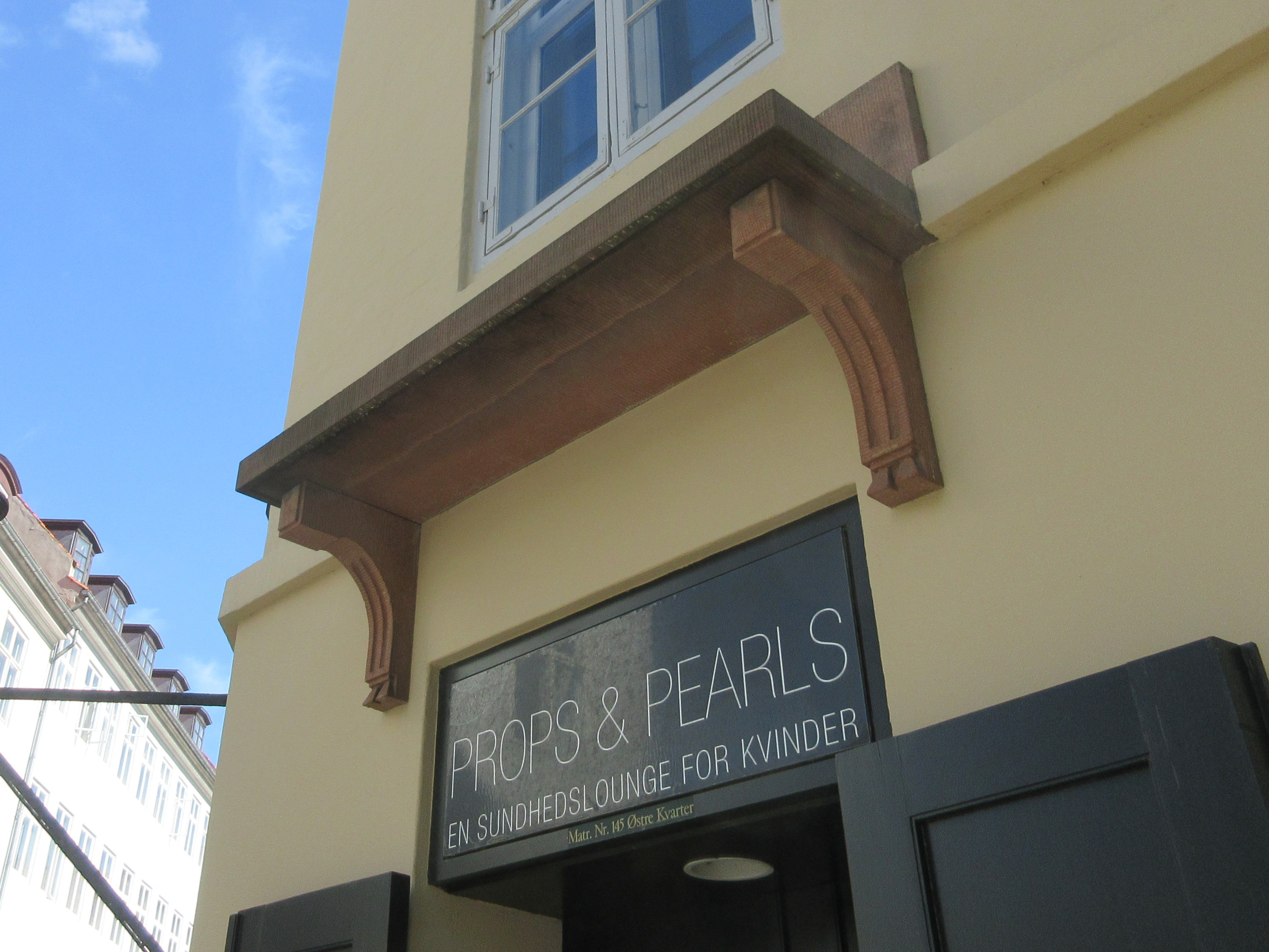
Hood mould above the corner entrance

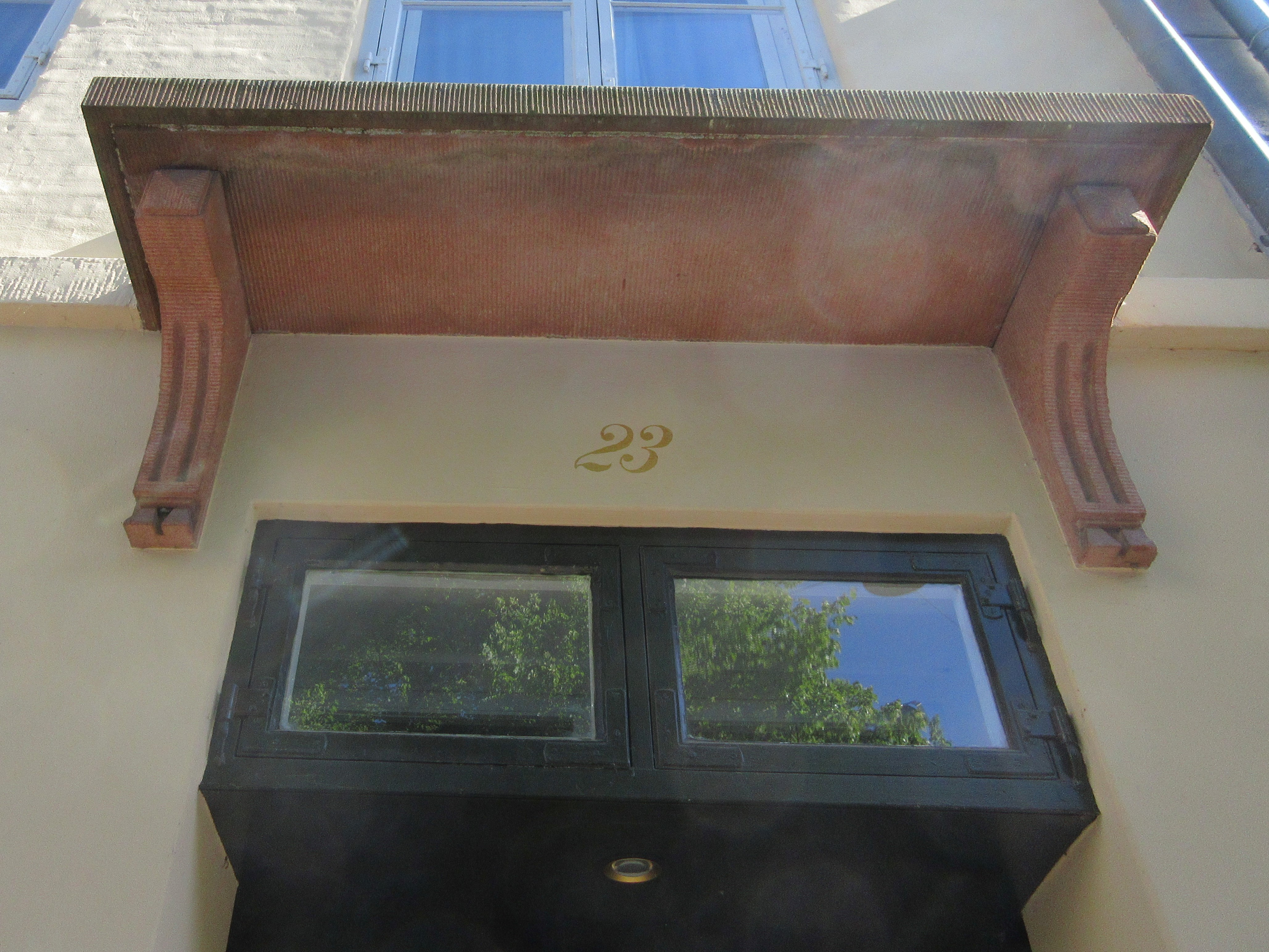
Hood mould above the Nikolaj Plads entrance

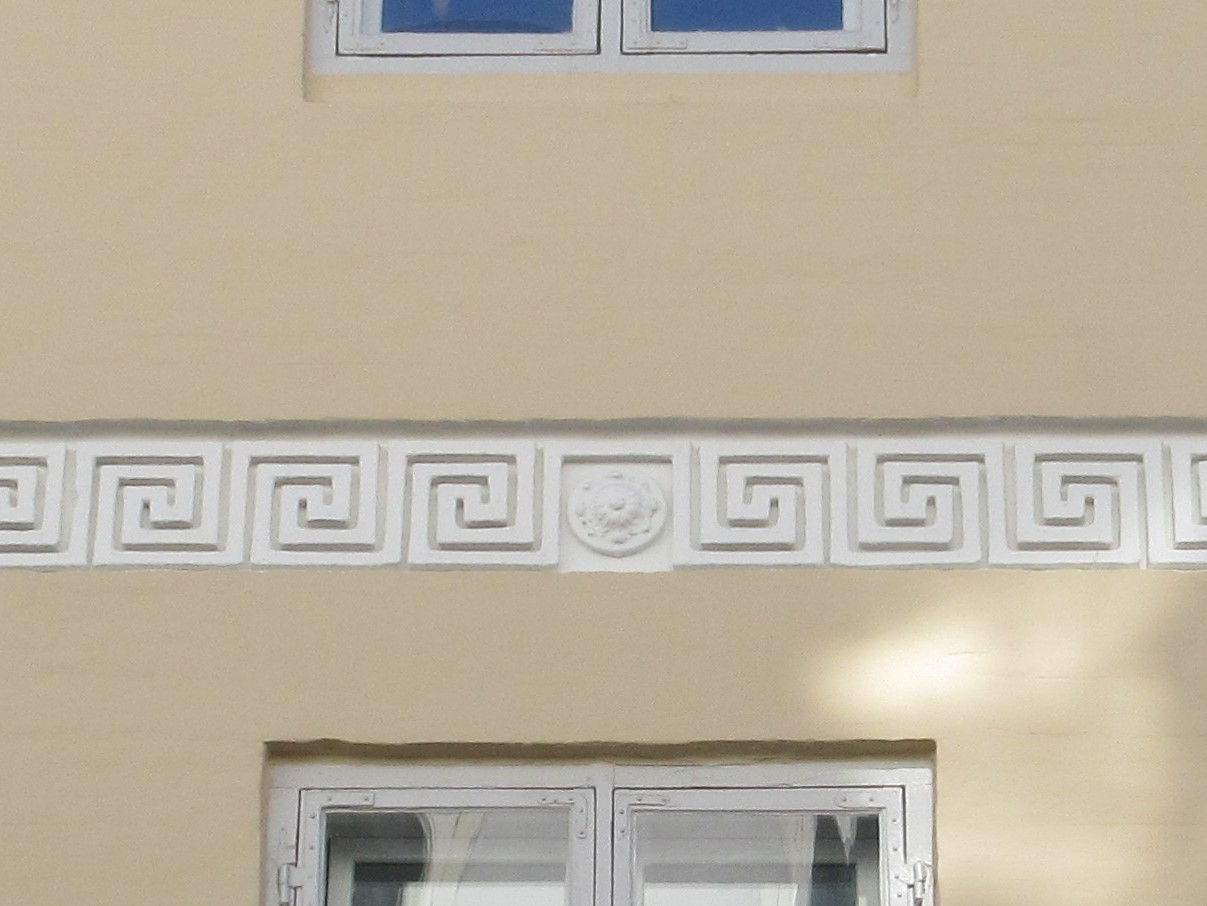
Frieze
