= Anders Peter Westenholz =

Danish merchant (1825–1886)

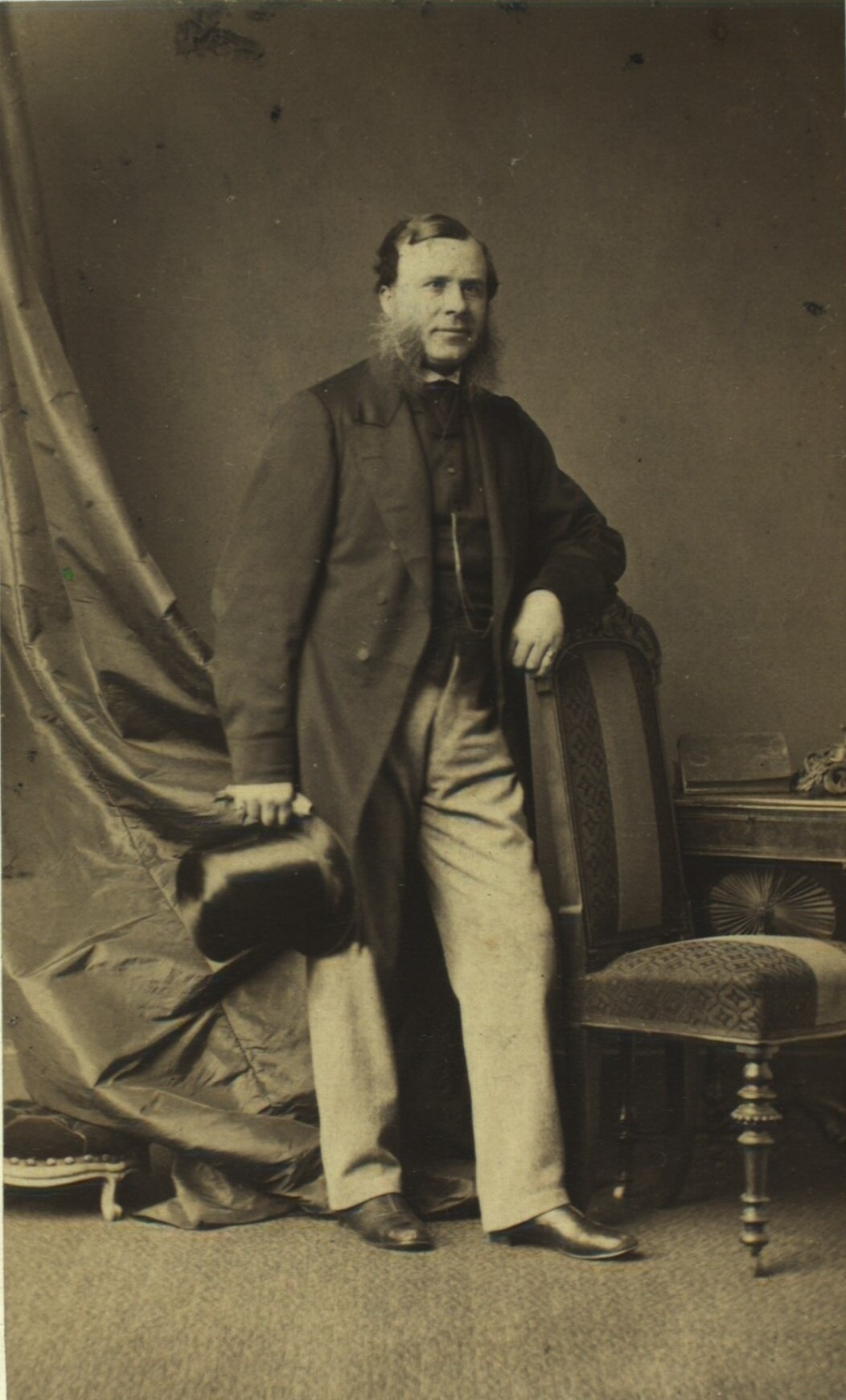
Anders Peter Westenholz photographed by Charles Thoma Newcombe.

Anders Peter Westenholz (16 October 1825 – 14 January 1886) was a Danish merchant and consul-general in London.

== Early life and education ==
Westenholz was born in Frederikshavn, the son of town bailiff in Frederikshavn Thomas Frederik Westenholz (1779–1830) and Anne Marie Elisabeth Aabel (1791–1880). His father was later promoted to herredsfoged in Års nd Slet hundreds, birk judge in Løgstør Birk and landeværnsmajor. After finishing school, he got his first business education in Aalborg, after which he went abroad.

== Career ==
Westenholz started an independent trading firm in Leith under the company name Stegmann, Westenholz & Co. As early as 1848, his older brother Regnar Westenholz had moved from Hamburg to London and had started a grain import business here, which, especially after the abolition of the English grain tariff in 1849, quickly took off very significantly. In the early 1950s, Westenholz joined his brother in England, where they traded as Westenholz' Brothers. Westenholz became the sole owner of the company after the brother had bought Mattrup near Horsens and had moved to Denmark. The company's main business was primarily based on the purchase of grain and later other agricultural products from Denmark. In 1874. he took his nephew R. A. Westenholz as a partner.

Westenholz was a very active member of the Danish colony in London. He was appointed both as Danish consul-general and as guardian of the Danish church in the city. In 1862, he was also appointed commissioner of the Danish government at the upcoming World Exhibition in London. He resigned as consul-general in 1883. He was replaced by Adolf Delcomyn.

== Personal life ==
In 1856, he married Helen Scott Young (1832–1901).

In 1882, Westenholz moved back to Denmark. In 1866, he bought Dronninggård north of Copenhagen. He died at Dronninggård in 1886 and is buried at the local Søllerød Cemetery.

== Awards ==
In 1859, he was created a Knight of the Order of the Dannebrog. In 1863, he was awarded the Cross of Honour. In 1882, he was created a 2nd-class Commander of the Order of the Dannebrog.
