= Carl Heinrich Delcomyn =

Danish gunsmith (1800–1864)

Carl Heinrich Delcomyn (31 December 1800 – 7 June 1864) was a Danish gunsmith. He was the half-brother of London-based businessman Adolf Delcomyn.

== Early life ==
Delcomyn was born on 20 December 1807 in Hellebæk, the son of gunsmith Carl Heinrick Delcomyn (Henrich Carl del Commune, 1771–1849) and Dorothea Conradine Ridiger. His father descended from a long line of gunsmiths from Liege Belgium. His father had come tom Denmark to work at Kronborg Rifle Factory, the same factory where Delcomyn's father worked at the time of the son's birth. He was later divorced from Delcomyn's mother and moved to Odense in 1811. He worked as a gunsmith for the 6th Dragon Regiment in Odense. After moving to Odense, he married secondly to Johanne Rebecca Dorothea Volkens (1788–1872). In this second marriage, he was the father of Adolf Delcomyb. Carl Heinrich Delcomun Jr. completed an apprenticeship in his father's workshop in Odense in 1934.

== Career ==
In 1825, Delcomyn moved to Copenhagen. In 1834, he was appointed regiment gunsmith at the 1st Jutland Infantry Regiment at Sølvgade Barracks. In 1849, he acquired citizenship as a gunsmith in Copenhagen and established his own workshop.

== Personal life ==
Delcomyn was married to Charlotte Frederikke Taagerup (1809–1896). He died on 7 June 1864 in Odense.

== Legacy ==
Delcomyn is considered one of the leading Danish gunsmiths of his time. He created numerous pistols and rifles for prominent members of the bourgeousie. His works are represented in the collections of a number of Danish museums, including the National Museum of Denmark, Odense Museum and Gammel Estrup.
