= Johan Joachim Pingel =

German-born Danish cabinetmaker

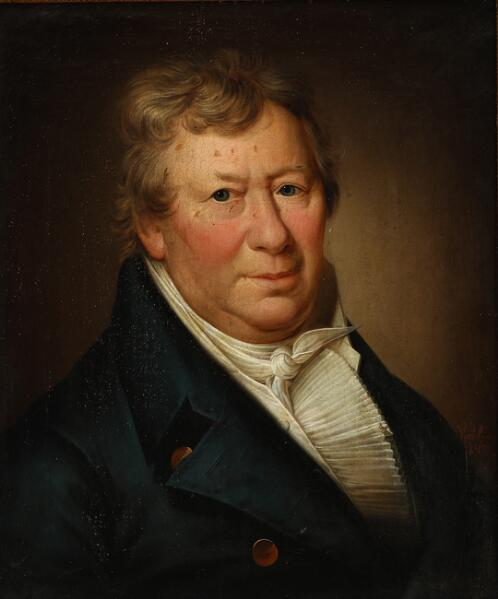
Portrait of Johan Joachim Pengel, 1819.

Johan Joachim Pingel (14 January 1752 – 4 December 1819), also known as Johan Joachim (Kochum) Pengel, was a German-born Danish cabinetmaker. His works are represented in the collections of the National Museum of Denmark, Brede House, Rosenborg Castle and the Danish Design Museum.

== Early life ==
Pingel was born in 1752 in Brandenburg, Prussia. It is not known when exactly he moved to Denmark.

== Career ==
Pingel was granted citizenship as a master joiner (snedkermester) in Copenhagen in February 1776. He was based at Store Strandstræde No. 113 from 1778 to 1795. He was then based at Østergade No. 42 from 1796 to 1806 and then Østergade No. 60. A "Cabinet-Maker' Pingel's House" in Nørregade is mentioned in 1819. The present building at Nikolaj Plads 23 was also constructed for Pingel in 1800, most likely as an investment since he never seems to have lived there.

In 1809, he began a collaboration with mechanic and clockmaker P. Stursa.

== Family ==
In 1776, Pingel married widow Cathrine Hunderup. She died in 1792. He married Johanne Margrethe Madsen (1669–1806) on 2 July 1797. He died on 4 December 1819 and is buried at St. Peter's Church. He was survived by four of his seven children (by his second wife): Carl Wilhelm Pingel (1800–1834), Ludwig August Pingel (13 August 1803 – 1845), Augusta Henrietta Pingel (1806–1855) and Edward Ferdinand Pingel (1808–1867).

== Legacy ==
Only a few of Pingel's works are known today. Many of his works incorporate mechanical installations. Secret rooms are another typical feature of his works.

Pingel's works are represented in the collections of the National Museum of Denmark, Brede House, Rosenborg Castle (Reg. No. 1522, Christian VII, Room 15). and the Danish Design Museum.

Johan Carl Frederik Viertel (1772–1834) painted a portrait of him.
