= Andreas Kirkerup =

Danish architect and master builder

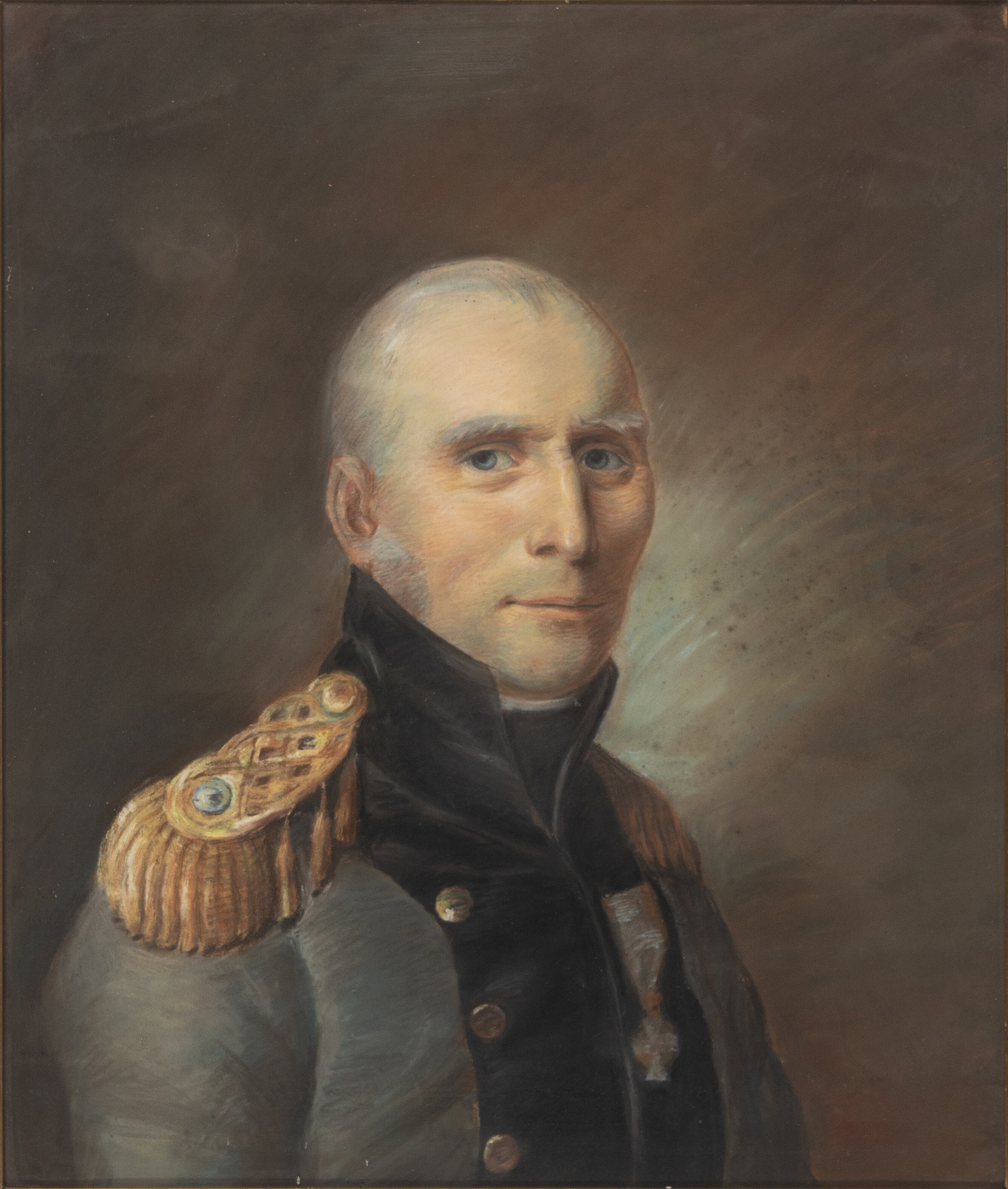
- Portrait of royal architect Andreas Kirkerup by Christian Horneman
- Born: 9 June 1749; Copenhagen, Denmark
- Died: 22 October 1810 (aged 61); Copenhagen, Denmark
- Education: Royal Danish Academy of Fine Arts
- Occupation: Architect

Andreas Johannes Kirkerup (9 June 1749 – 22 October 1810) was a Danish architect and master builder and one of the most significant pupils of Caspar Frederik Harsdorff. Together with architects such as Andreas Hallander and Johan Martin Quist, he played a major role in the rebuilding of Copenhagen after the Great Fire of 1795.

== Early life and education ==
Kirkerup was born in on 9 June 1749 Copenhagen, the son of carpenter Johannes Andreasen Kirkerup (død 1755) and Dorothea Pedersdatter Wiese. Kirkerup followed in his father's footsteps, training under master builder Johan Boye Junge (1735–1807) who endorsed him to study architecture at the Royal Danish Academy of Fine Arts where he studied under Caspar Frederik Harsdorff (1735 – 1799). He won the Academy's small and large silver medals in 1768, the small gold medal in 1771 and finally the large gold medal in 1773.

== Career ==
Kirkerup set up a business as master carpenter in 1774 and was appointed architect for the engineering troops. He won great recognition for his work and was appointed Court Carpenter in 1775 and Court Architect in 1791.

He was one of a select group of Harsdorff's students from the Academy, together with architects such as Andreas Hallander and Johan Martin Quist, who obtained a near monopoly on the rebuilding of Copenhagen after the Great Fire of 1795.

== Other pursuits ==
The group of builders which Kirkerup belonged to reinforced their friendship and professional connections through their membership of lodges, the Royal Copenhagen Shooting Society, the civil guard and the fire corps.

Still a student, Kirkerup enrolled in the fire corps in 1772 and was promoted through the ranks. He led the efforts to control the fire during the British Bombardment of Copenhagen in 1807 but was severely hurt in the line of duty. He died a few years later from his wounds and was buried at Frederiksberg Church.

== Personal life ==
Kirkerup was married to Clara Holst (1756-1835), a daughter of distiller Jens Pedersen Holst and Cathrine Hansdatter Handrup. They Their daughter and only child Dorthea Cathrine Kirkerup (1880-1837). She married twice, first to artillery lieutenant Mathias Christian Ipsen (1887-1802, one daughter) and then to court inspector Hans Henrik Schønberg (1785-1845, two daughters).

== Selected works ==
- Corselitze, Falster (1775–77, attributed)
- Dronninggård, Holte (1783, attributed)
- Arresødal, Frederiksværk (1786)
- Edelgave, Egedal (1791)
- Liselund, Møn (1782)
- Royal Horse Guards Barracks, Copenhagen (1792)
- Brede House, Kongens Lyngby (1795)
- Store Frederikslund (1782–90)
- Garrison Hospital extension, Copenhagen (1799–1800)
- Chinese Summerhouse, Frederiksberg Gardens, Copenhagen (1799–1801)
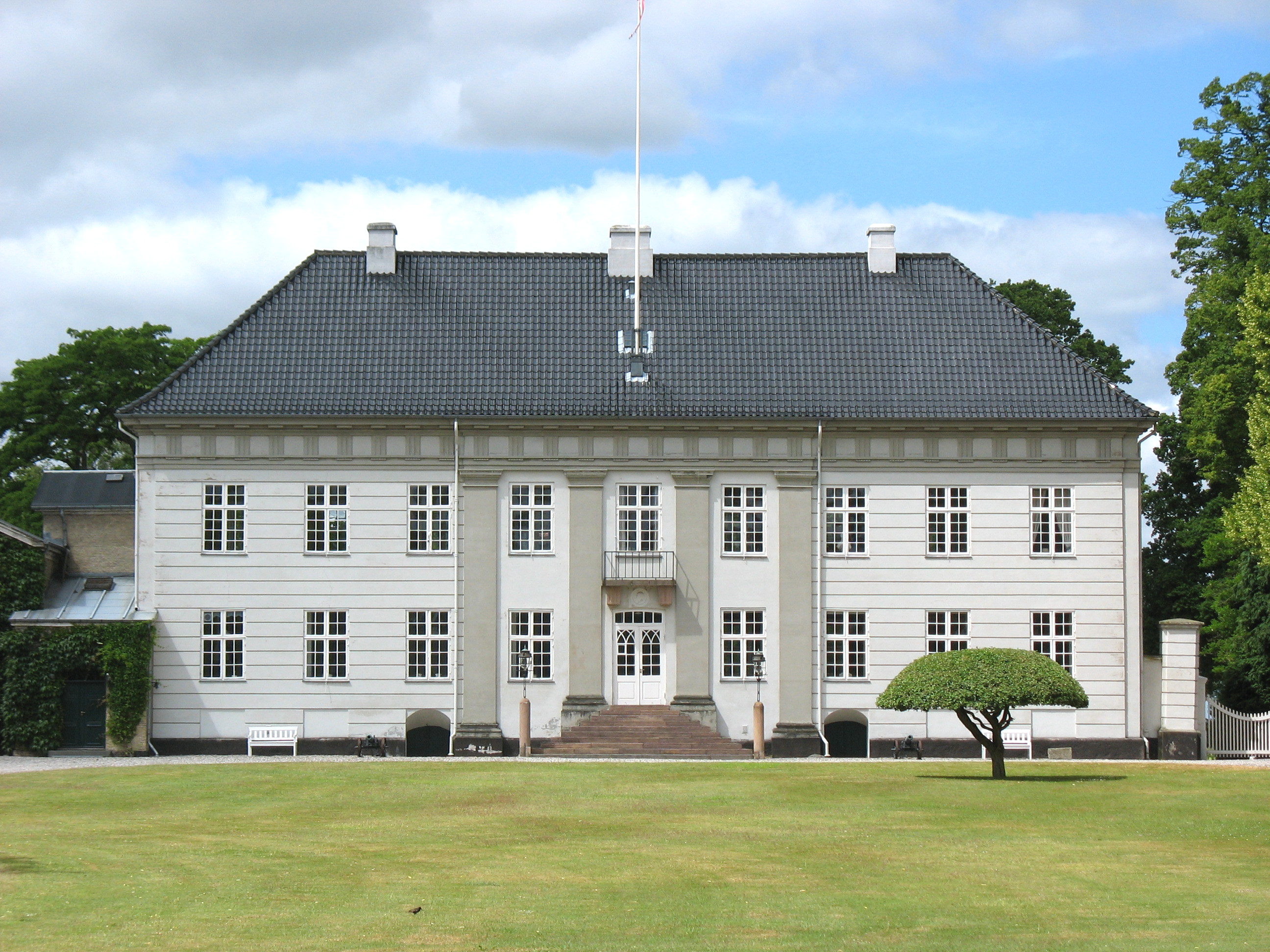
Corselitze

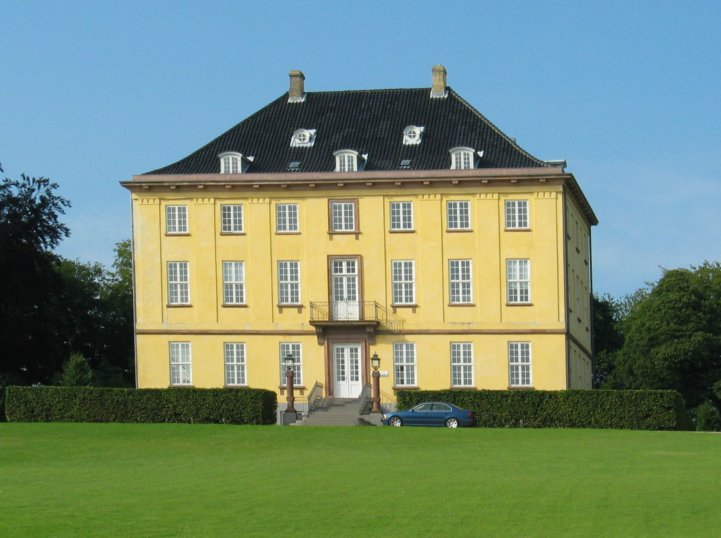
Næsseslottet

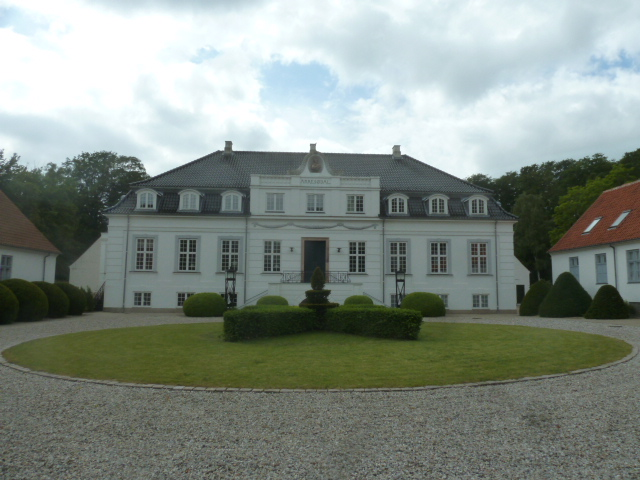
Arresødal

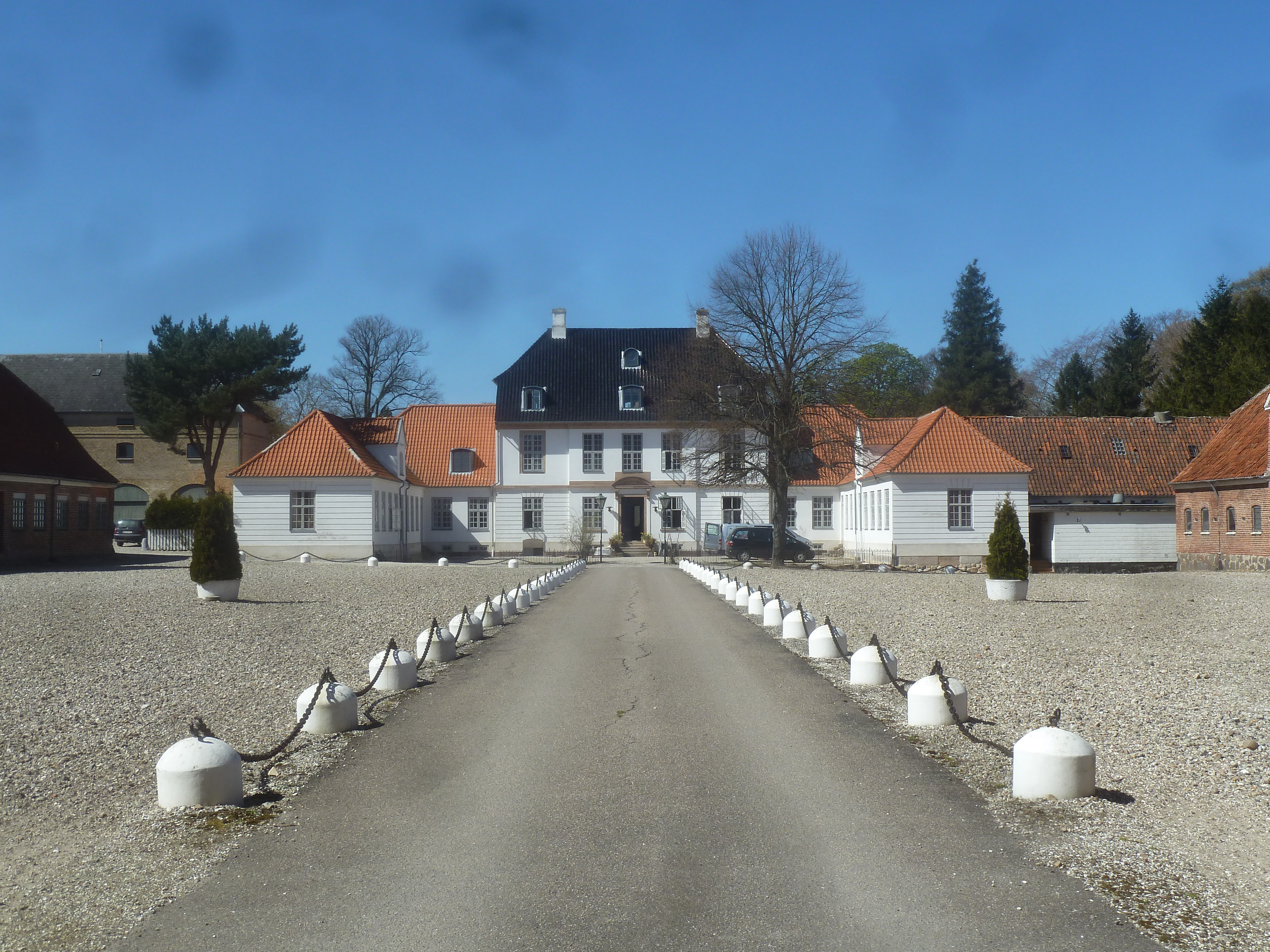
Edelgave

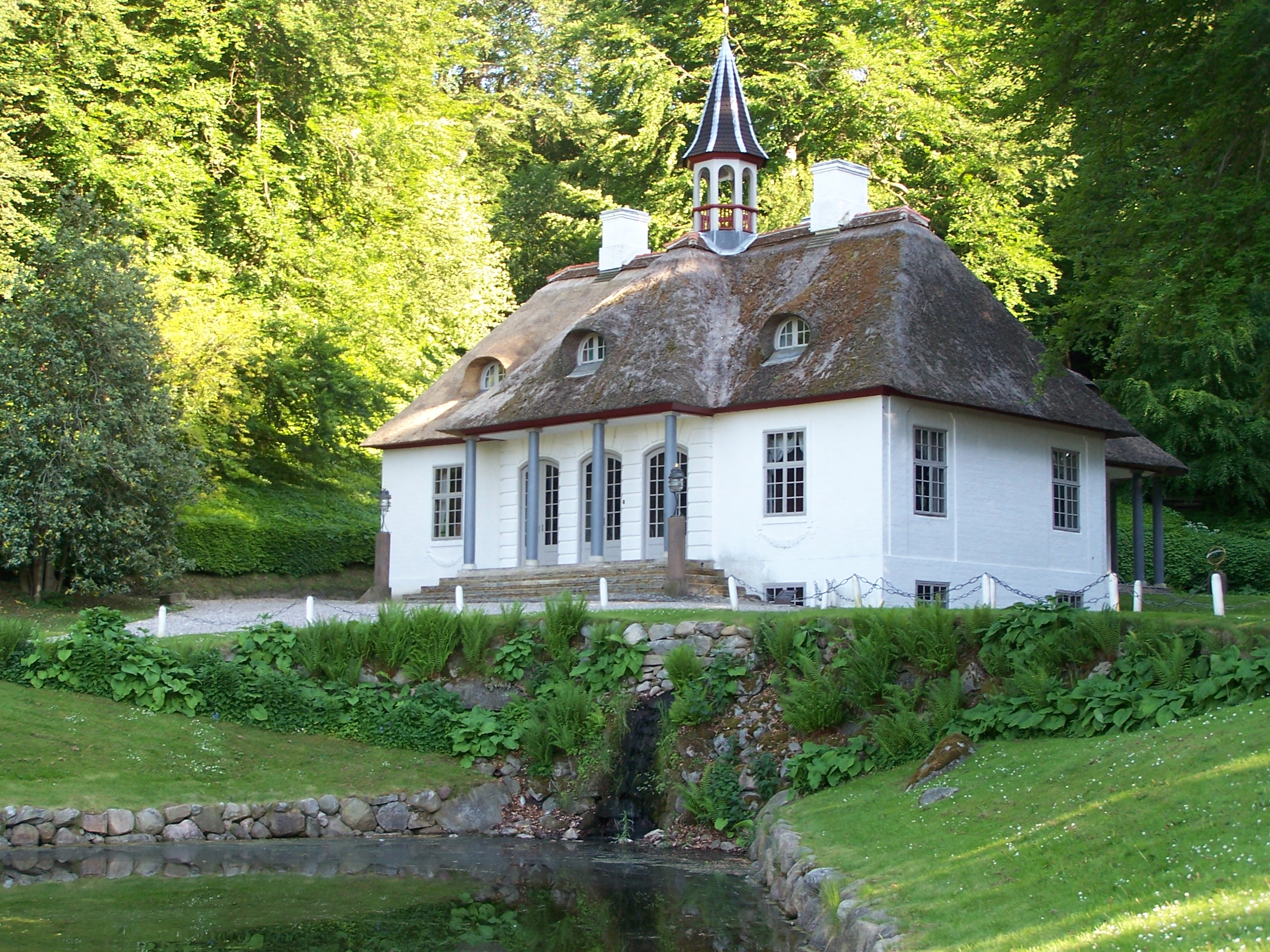
Liselund

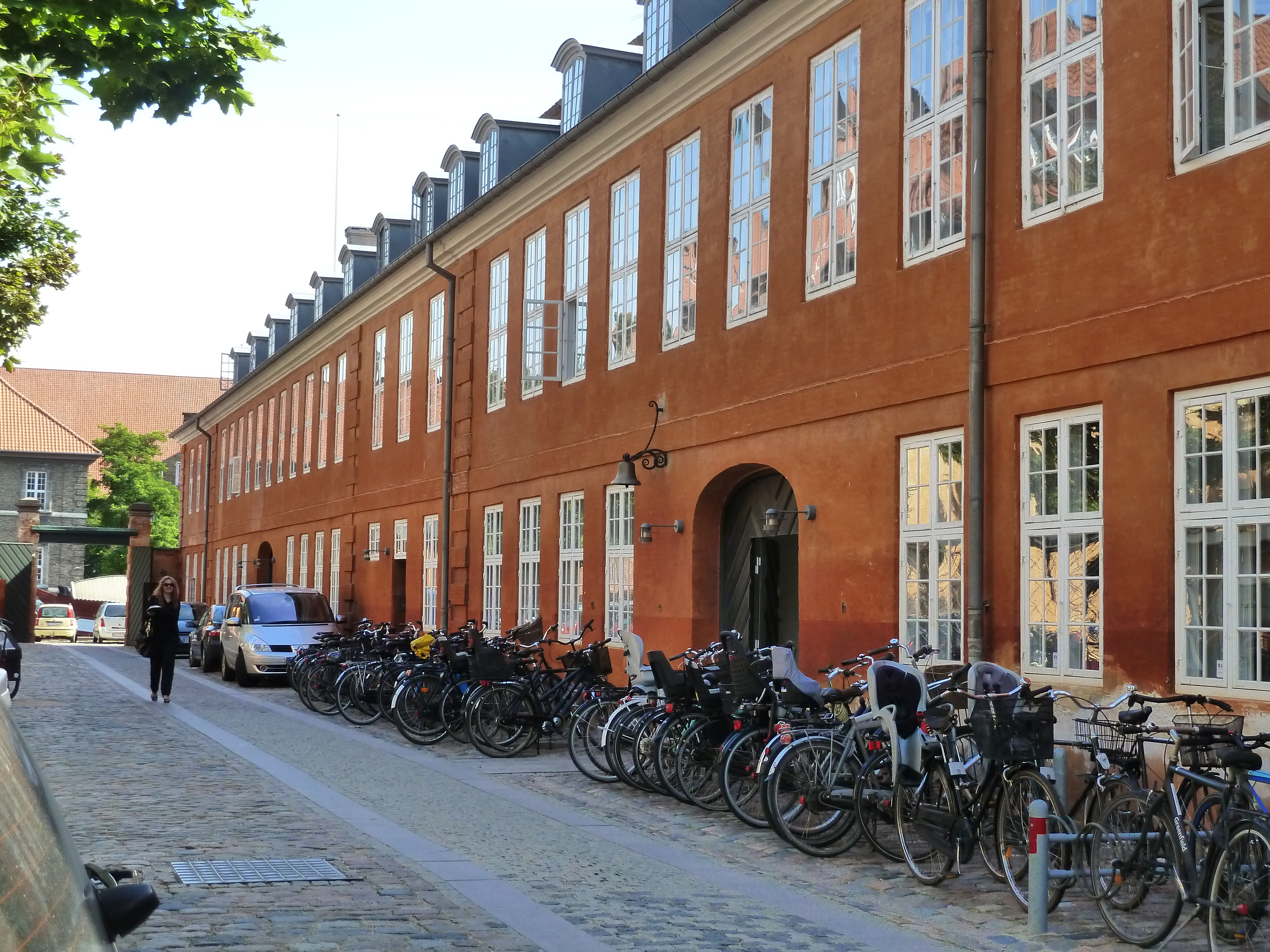
Royal Horse Guards Barracks

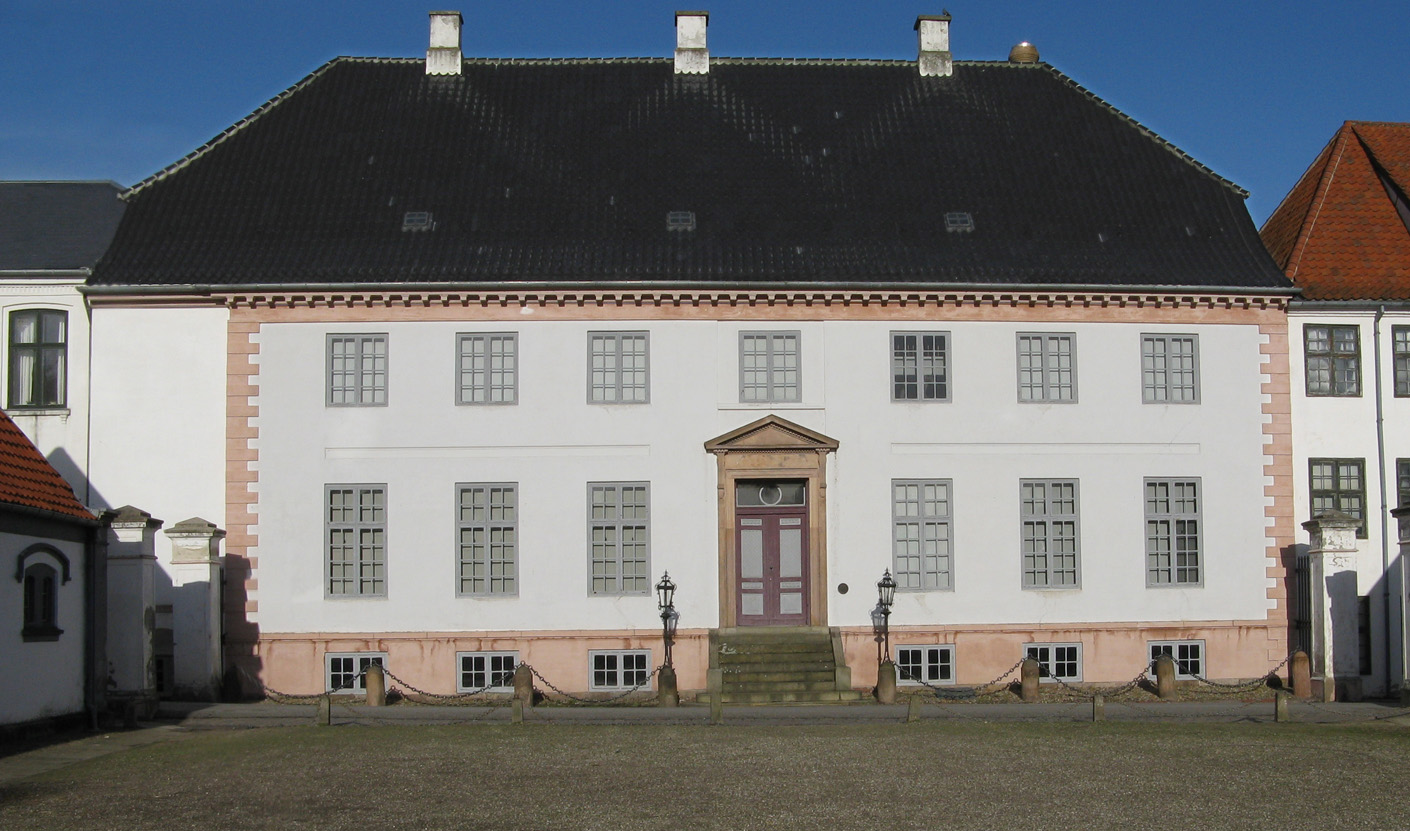
Brede House

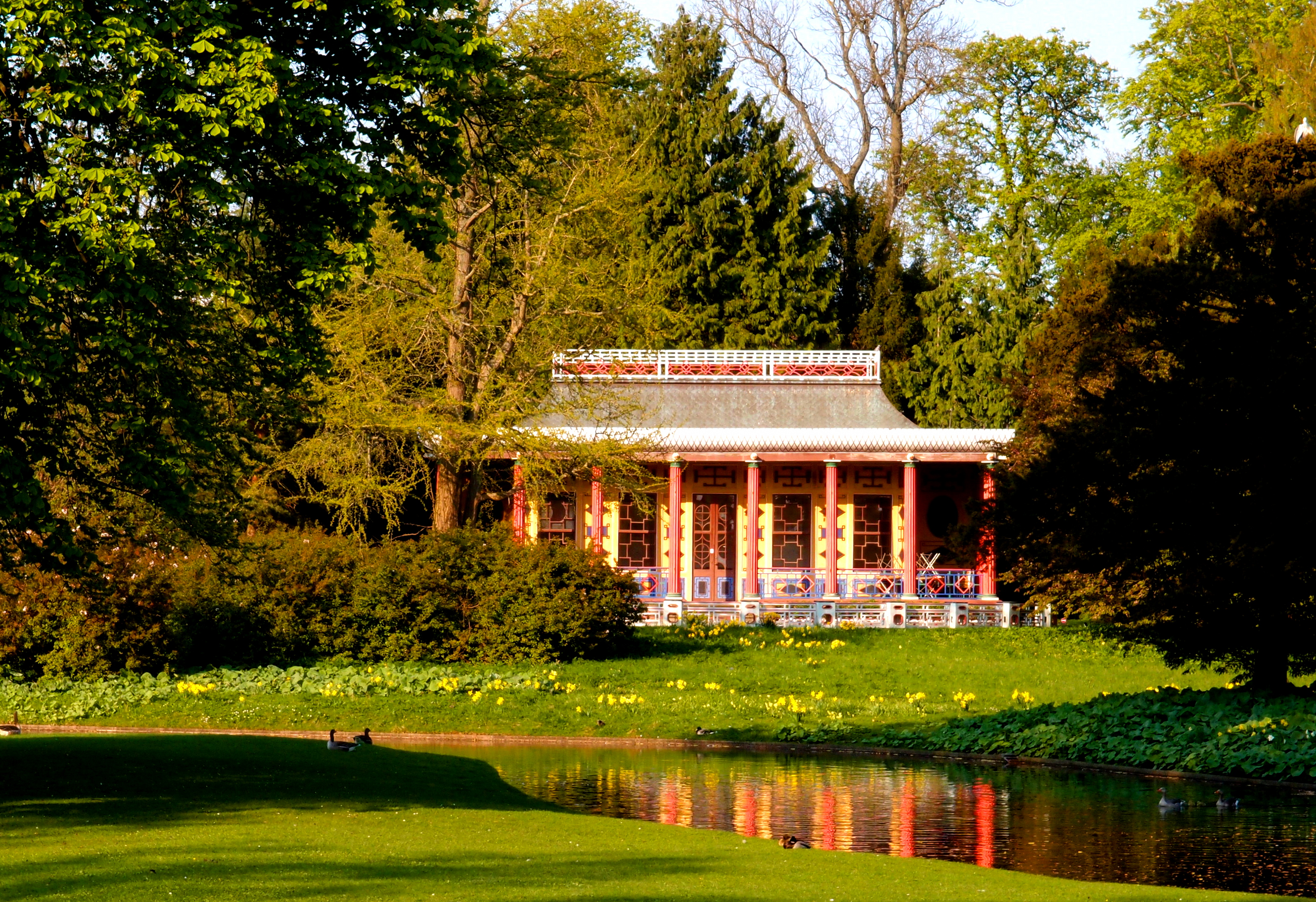
Chinese Summerhouse, Frederiksberg Gardens
