= Barnekow family =

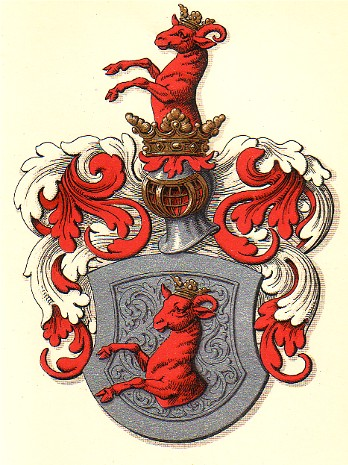
Barnekow coat of arms, drawn by Anders Thiset, 1912.

The Barnekow family is a medieval German noble family originating from Mecklenburg and Pommerania. Though the original Mecklenburg branch died out around 1600, Danish, Swedish, and German lines of the family still exist.

The family shares its name with the present-day municipality of Barnekow in Germany. The etymology of the name Barnekow has Wendish origins: "Baran" meaning ram, "ek" for the diminutive form, and "ow" referring to a place.

== History ==
Historical evidence of the Barnekow family of Rügen dates back to 1255. Earlier references are found of Alvericus de Bernekowe, who was born in Barnekow around 1186. He had a son recorded as Hinricus de Barnekowe. Hinricus' son Ulrich Barnekow is recorded as a witness to a treaty between the King of Denmark Erik Menved and Henrik of Mecklenburg in 1307.

=== Danish line ===
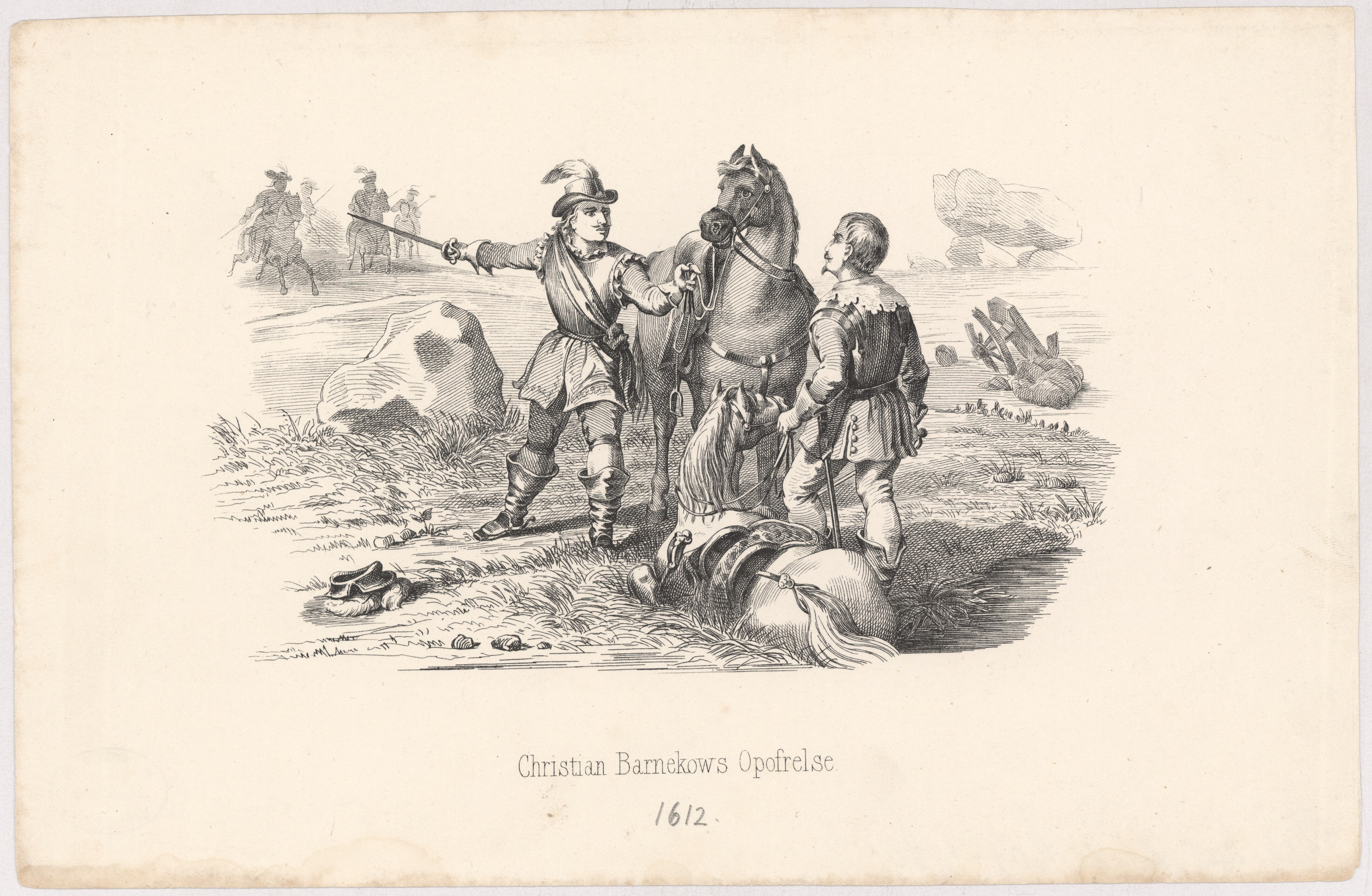
Christian Barnekow's sacrifice, 1612.

The oldest branch of the Pommeranian Barnekow family moved to Denmark in the beginning of the 16th century when Hans Barnekow acquired the estate Birkholm (now Løvenborg). Hans became a naturalised citizen on 13 December 1547, at which time he was also ennobled. Christian Barnekow inherited the estate after the death of his elder brother Johan Barnekow in 1603. He had already acquired the nearby estate Tølløsegård in 1592.

A descendant of a separate line, Wilken Zacharias Barnekow (1730–1784), later also settled in Denmark, where he served as a lieutenant colonel. His descendants received a patent recognising them as members of the Danish nobility on 26 September 1877. Among those who thus became nobles was Christian Barnekow, a composer who produced written histories about the family.

At various points in time, descendants of the Barnekow family have owned the estates of Løvenborg, Tølløsegård, Gammel Køgegård, Ødemark (in Sorø Municipality), Jomfruens Egede, and Nielstrup (in Guldborgsund Municipality).

=== Swedish line ===
Christian Barnekow owned Vidskøvle slot and Lillö slot in Skåne. His descendants became members of the Swedish nobility in 1664, following the Treaty of Roskilde in 1658, when Scania became a Swedish territory. His grandson, also named Christian Barnekow (1626–1666), was given the title of baron in 1751. In 1816, his descendant, Christian Barnekow (1773–1830) was given the title of count, and thus the head of this branch of the family inherit that title. Several descendants of this line became members of the Swedish Parliament.

=== German line ===
A German noble line still exists.

== Coat of arms ==
It is possible that there have been two different noble families with this name, as the Mecklenburg branch carried a separate coat of arms from the Pommeranian Barnekows of Rügen. The coat of arms used by the Rügen branch consists of a shield bearing the upper body of a ram in red on a silver field, above which sits a helmet between two white ostrich or peacock feathers. Both the ram and the helmet bear crowns, though the specific design of the helmet varies.

== Notable members ==
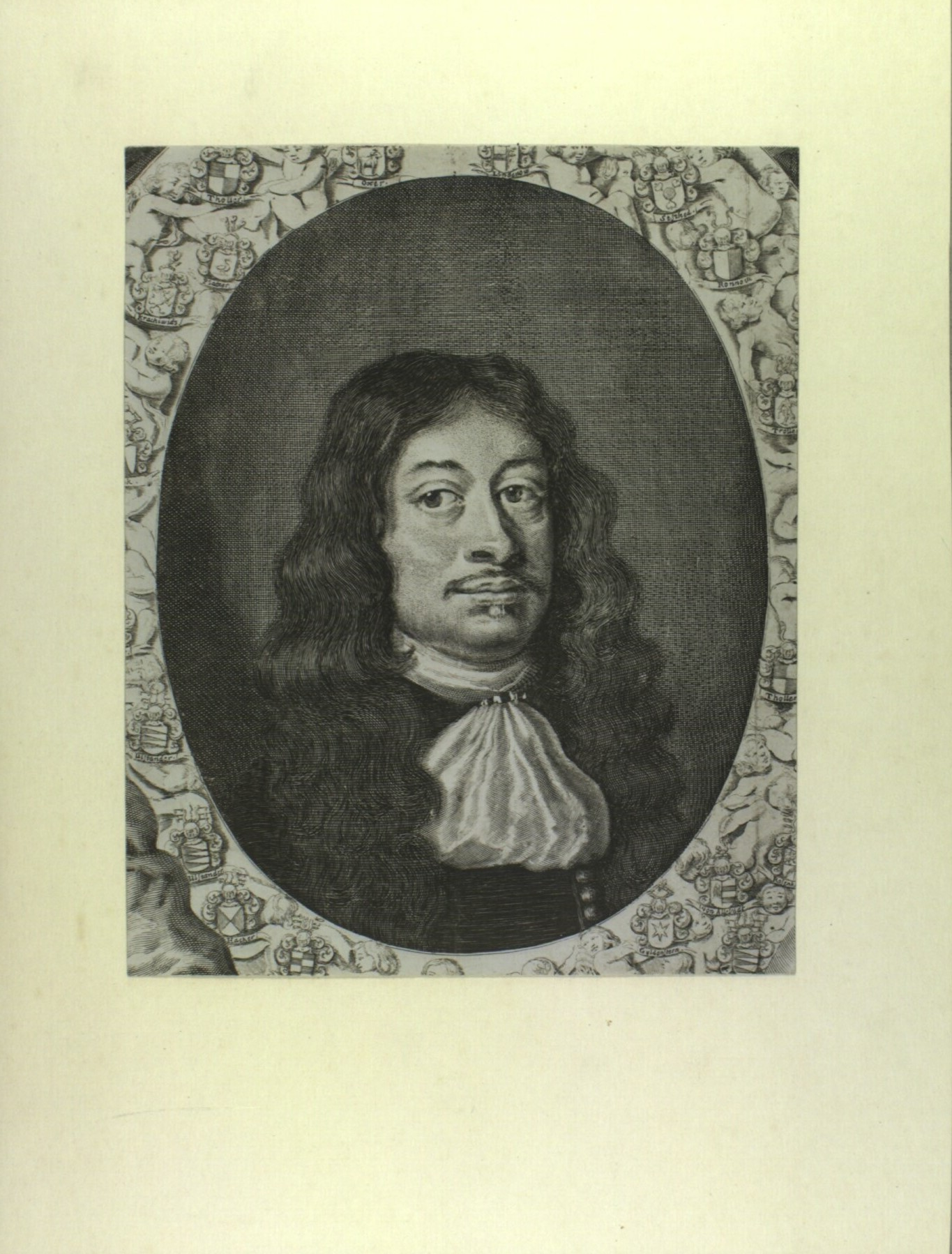
Christian Barnekow (1626–1666)

Notable descendants of the family include, but are not limited to:

- Hans Barnekow (?–1559), diplomat and member of the Privy Council of Denmark.
- Christian Barnekow (1556–1612), extensive traveller and royal diplomat of the King of Denmark
- Christian Barnekow (1626–1666), traveller and commissioner in Skåneland, husband of Brita Scheel.
- Kjell Christoffer Barnekow (1663–1700), Swedish colonel
- Christian Barnekow (1694–1762), Swedish baron, general
- Kjell Christoffer Barnekow (1730–1818), baron
- Adolf Fredrik Barnekow (1744–1787), baron, architect, head of the Royal Swedish Theaters
- Christian Barnekow (1773–1830), count
- Kjell Christoffer Barnekow, (1781–1875), baron
- Adolf Barnekow (1838–1924), count
- Fredrik Barnekow (1839–1912), baron
- Adolph Gotthardt Joachim Barnekow (1805–1839)
- Christian Barnekow (1837–1913), Danish composer
- Raven Freiherr von Barnekow (1897–1941), World War I flying ace, Luftwaffe General
