= Rudolph Bay =

Danish musician

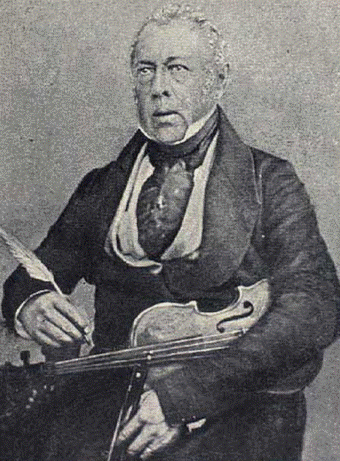
David Rudolph Vilhelm Bay

David Rudolph Vilhelm Bay (9 July 1791 – 15 May 1856) was a Danish composer, singer and violinist.

He was student in 1808 and studied theology, but from 1816 to 1831, a secretary in the consulate in Algiers. During his stay in Algiers, he composed the melody Vift stolt paa Kodans Bølge (1817) which is the best known of his songs. In 1819–1820 he traveled in Italy, where he received training in singing in Rome.
