= Christian Barnekow =

Danish nobleman and composer

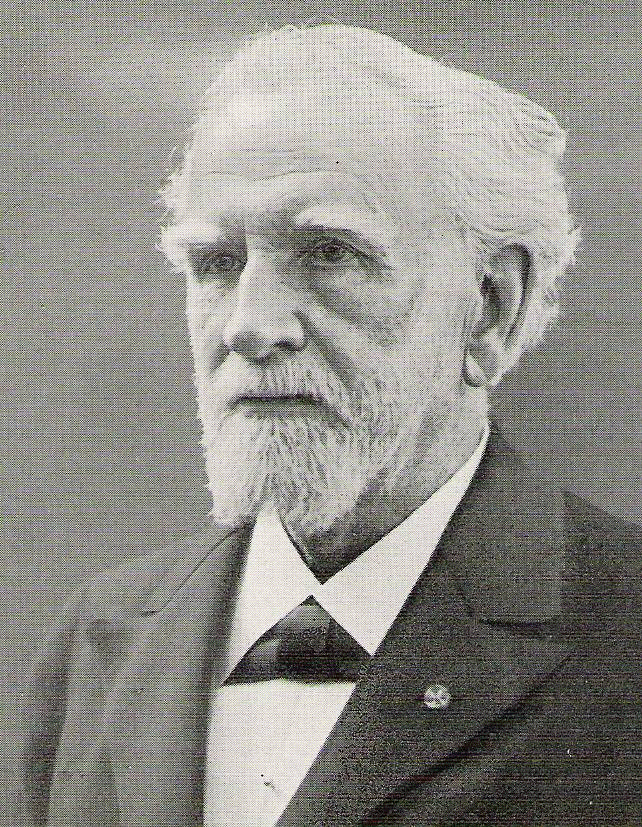
Christian Barnekow

Christian Barnekow (28 July 1837 – 20 March 1913) was a Danish nobleman and composer. He was born in Luz-Saint-Sauveur, France, and died in Copenhagen.
