= Holte =

Town in Denmark

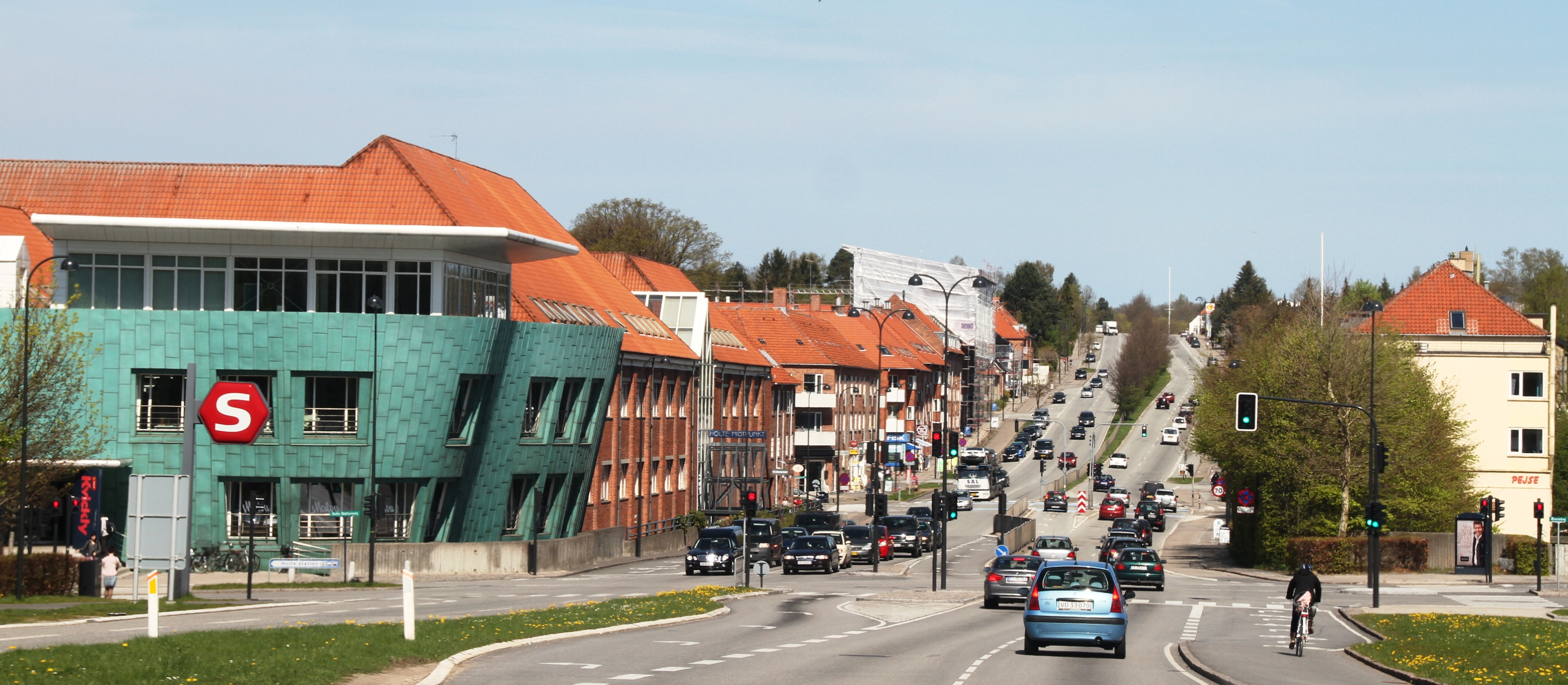
Picture of Holte with Holte Midtpunkt in view

Holte is a suburban district in Rudersdal Municipality on the northern outskirts of Copenhagen, Denmark. The local town centre is centred on Holte station and is surrounded by extensive areas of single-family, detached homes as well as several lakes and forests. The district has merged with the old villages of Søllerød and Øverød which both belong to Holte postal district (2840 Holte). Gammel Holte ("Old Holte"), a few kilometres to the east, also in Rudersdal Municipality but merged with the urban area of neighbouring Hørsholm, predates what is now called Holte by several hundred years; in the past Holte was formally referred to as Ny Holte ("New Holte") to distinguish the two.[1]

== History ==
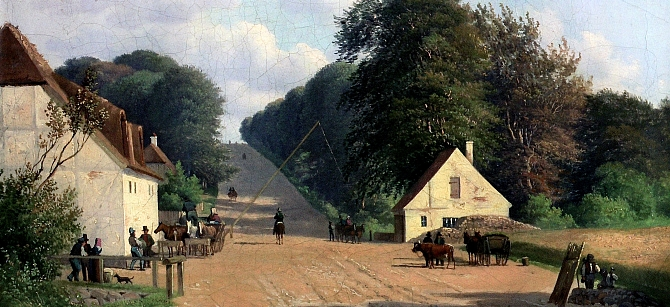
Frederiksborg Kongevej at Geel's Hill in present-day Holte. Painting by Andreas Juuel

Modern Holte is located on land that used to belong to the Dronninggård estate. The name Holte originally referred to the medieval village of Holte (now Gammel Holte – literally Old Holte) located a few kilometres to the northeast of the modern district. When the owner of Holtegård moved his inn to a new site on Kongevejen in the 1780s, he gave it the name Ny Holte Kro ("New Holte Inn"). This name was adopted for the local railway station when the North Line opened in 1864. The name of the station and the surrounding district was later changed to Holte while the name of the old village was changed to Gammel Holte ("Old Holte").

== Landmarks ==
The Søllerød Town Hall, completed in 1942, was designed in the Functionalist style by Arne Jacobsen and Flemming Lassen. The town centre also contains the Holte Midtpunkt shopping centre. Holte Church was completed on the top of Geel's Hill (Geels Bakke) in 1945.

== Natural surroundings ==
Several lakes are located in the Holte area. There is a small leisure craft harbor and a beach at Vejlesø which is connected to the larger lake Furesø on the western boundary of the district by a canal. A small ferry operates on the two lakes in the summer time. Søllerød Lake separates Holte from Søllerød to the east.

Holte also borders on the natural areas Vaserne, Rude Forest, Søllerød Naturpark and Geel's Forest.

== Notable people ==
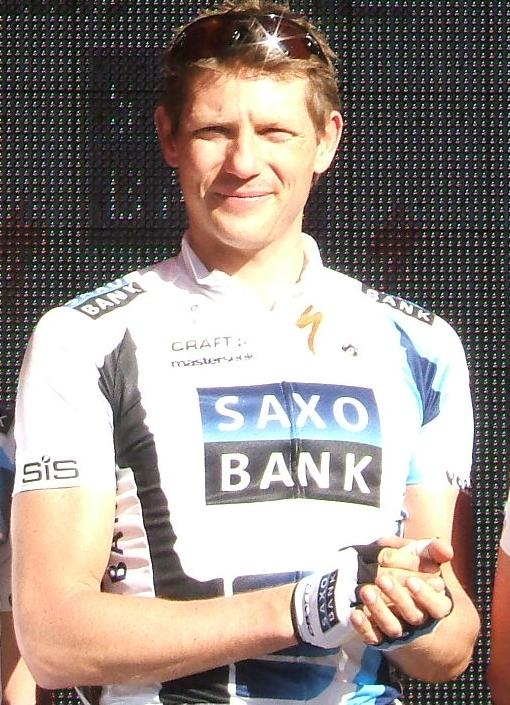
Frank Hoj, 2009

- Johanne Hesbeck (1873–1927) photographer, she ran a portrait studio in Holte, 1915 to 1927
- Emil Telmányi (1892 – 1988 in Holte) a Hungarian violinist
- Natasja Crone Back (born 1970) a Danish journalist and TV show presenter, raised in Holte

=== Sport ===
- Frank Høj (born 1973 in Holte) a retired Danish road bicycle racer, competed at the 2000 and 2004 Summer Olympics
- Alexander Fischer (born 1986 in Holte) a Danish footballer, with over 350 club caps
- Peter Gade (born 1976) a former Danish professional badminton player, he resides in Holte
- Jacob Larsen (born 1997 in Holte) a Danish basketball player
