= Sjælsø =

Lake in North Zealand, Denmark

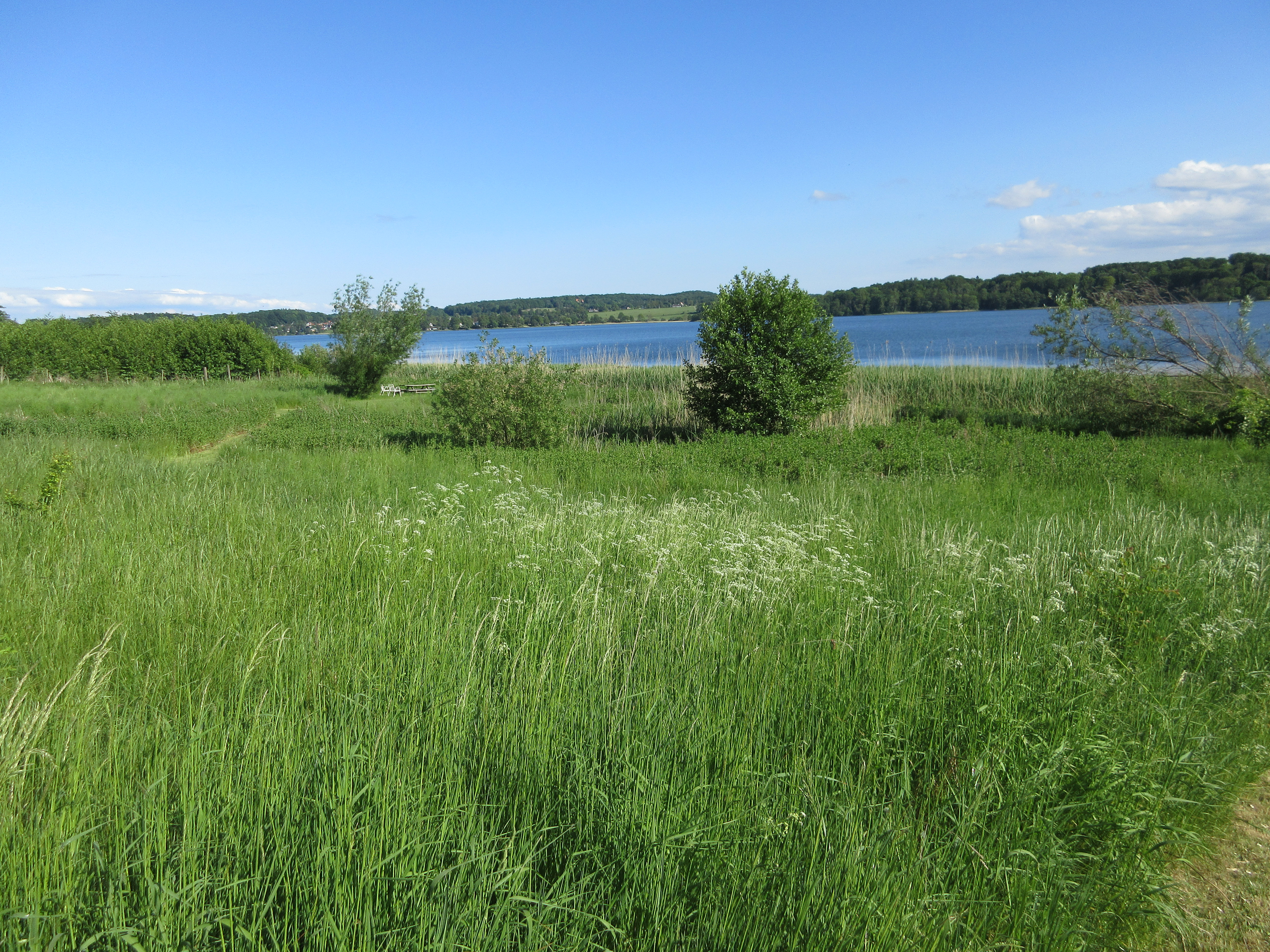
- Sjælsø viewed from the footpath at the village of Sjælsmark

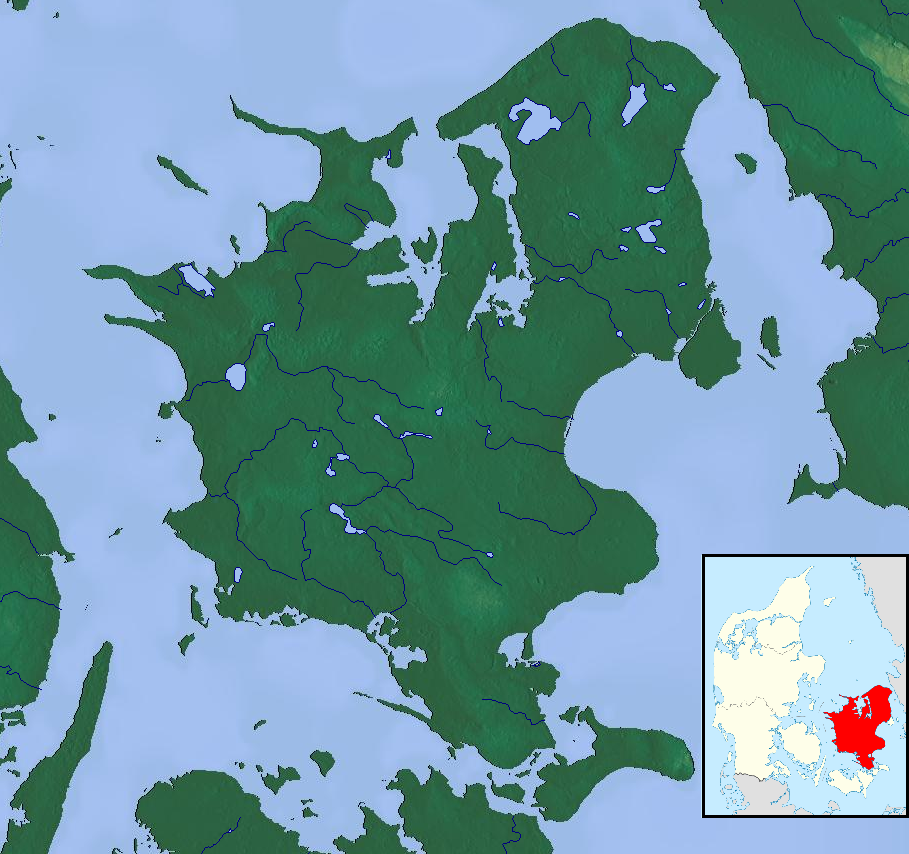
- Location within Zealand
- Location: Zealand
- Coordinates: 55°51′55″N 12°26′38″E
- Primary outflows: Usserød Å
- Max. length: 3 km (1.9 mi)
- Surface area: 2.93 km^{2} (1.13 sq mi)
- Max. depth: 5.5 m (18 ft)
- Settlements: Ravnsnæs, Sjælsmark

Sjælsø is a lake straddling the borders between the municipalities of Rudersdal, Allerød and Hørsholm in North Zealand to the north of Copenhagen, Denmark. Situated immediately to the north of the suburban town of Birkerød, it is surrounded by a mixture of farmland, pastures and small woodlands.

The lake has an area of 293 hectares and is relatively shallow. It is fed by five minor streams and drains into the Øresund though Usserød Å. It is owned by Nordvand A/S.

== History ==
The name Sjælsø means "skelsø" and refers to its position on the border between several parishes and hundreds.

Sjælsø was owned by the crown from 1391 until 1898. It was then sold in public auction to three fishermen whose families owned it until 1932 when it was sold to "Fællesudvalget for vandindvinding ved Sjælsø", a partnership between the municipalities of Søllerød, Lyngby-Taarbæk and Gentofte. The first water works opened at the lake in 1936 and a second one opened in 1962. The latter remained in use until 1998.

== Settlements ==
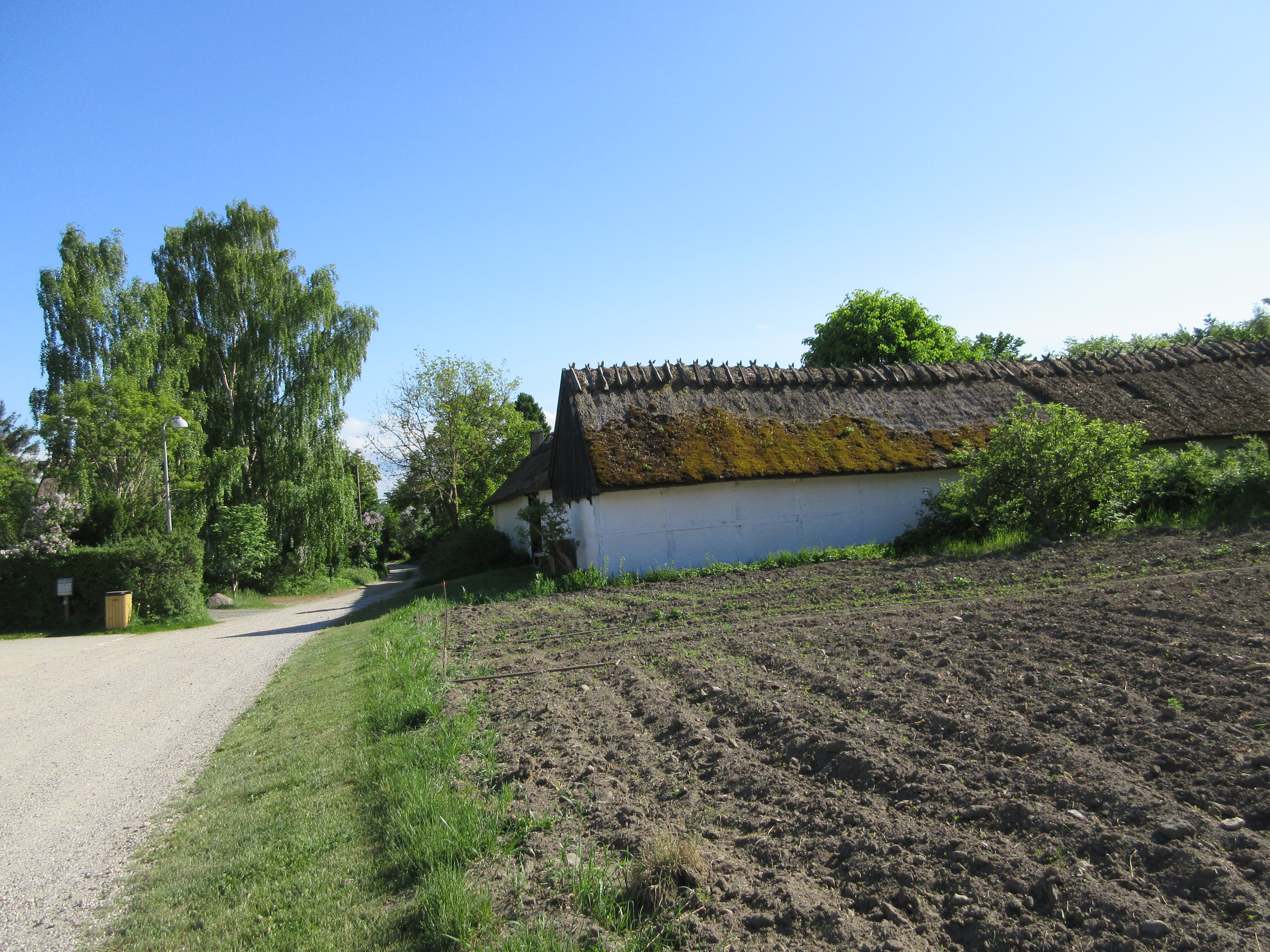
Tingstedgård in the old Sjælsmark village

Birkerød's Kajerød neighbourhood is located just south of the lake. The small town of Ravnsnæs is situated on a small peninsula in the southeastern corner of the lake. The old village of Sjælsmark is located on the north side of the lake. It consists of a few farmhouses located on both sides of the street Landsbyen which extends south from Sjælsmarksvej. One of the farmhouses, Tingstedgård, is a listed building. A 200 metres long footpath leads down to the lake from the southern end of the dead end street. The village of Isterød and Næbbegård, a former folk high school, are located to the northeast of the lake.

== Surroundings ==
Sjælsø is located in an undulating marine landscape. Most of the shoreline is open countryside and much of it is protected.

The vast Høvelte-Sandholm military training grounds are located to the west of the lake and were protected in 2000 to preserve one of the largest open landscapes in North Zealand. It has an area of 503 hectares and adjoins the Tokkekøb Hegn woodlands in the north and another protected area in the southwest. The area comprises the two small woods Høvelte Fredskov and Ellebæklund. It also contains the Drabæk Mose bogland and the small lake Carinasøen as well as the streams Ellebæk, Drabæk, Degnebæk and Kajerød which all drain into Sjælsø.

A 500 hectares area to the east of the lake was protected in 2006. The small woodland Nærrebrød Plantage, with 200-year old beech and oak trees, is located directly on the southeastern shores of the lake.

== Recreational use ==
The restaurant Jægershytten, located at the end Bakkevej on the western shores of the lake, is open in the summer months (1 May – 1 October). Swimming in the lake is possible from Sjælsø Strand, a small sandy beach located approximately 200 metres to the southeast of Jægerhytten. Fishing is permitted. Birkerød Sport Fishers' Association owns three boats. Sailing is not permitted without permission from Nordvand A/S.

== See also ==
- Sandholm
