= Gammel Holtegård =

Arts centre in Denmark

Gl. Holtegaard
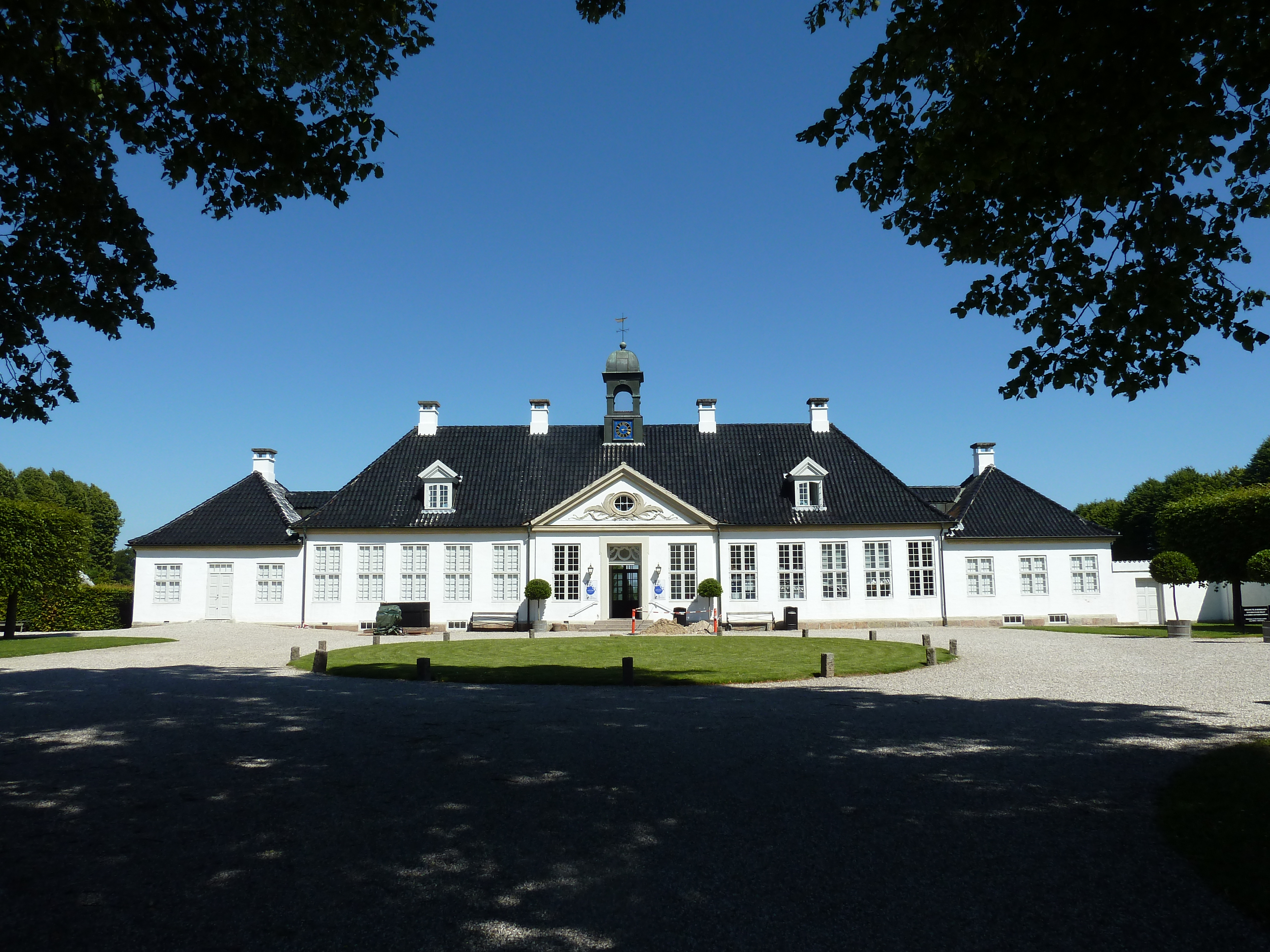
- Interactive map of the Gl. Holtegaard area

General information
- Architectural style: Baroque
- Location: Holte, Denmark
- Coordinates: 55.8289°N 12.5175°E
- Construction started: 1755
- Completed: 1757
- Client: Architect's own use

Design and construction
- Architect: Lauritz de Thurah

Gl. Holtegaard is a former Manor house in Rudersdal Municipality north of Copenhagen, Denmark, today operated as an arts centre and a museum. It was built by the Danish Baroque architect Lauritz de Thurah (1706–1759), for his own use in 1757. Its original Baroque gardens were reconstructed in 2003.

== History ==
In 1754, Lauritz de Thurah acquired an agricultural property, a former tenant farn, in order to establish a suitable country house for himself outside Copenhagen. Simultaneously he was also building a town house for himself in Amaliegade in Copenhagen's new Frederiksstaden district, the responsibility of which he had been assigned after the death of Nicolai Eigtved (1701–1754) the previous year. Prior to that, he had lived some years at his estate at Børglum Abbey to which he had retired when his Baroque style fell out of favour and most of the prestigious assignments in the capital went to Eigtved.

To begin with he demolished the old farmhouse and laid out a large garden à la française with symmetrical plantings of fruit trees and flowering plants, bounded by lime tree avenues. When the new buildings were completed, it included farm buildings and a royal privileged inn. The house was completed in 1757. It was a single-story, three-winged building with a hip roof topped by a flèche. Lauritz de Thurah had the two clocks specially cast for the building. The estate also included agricultural buildings and a royal privileged inn. However, de Thurah died just two years after his new house was completed.

At the beginning of the 20th century, the estate was owned by Hans Niels Andersen (1852–1937), founder of the East Asiatic Company. He conducted a thorough restoration of the main building with the assistance of the architect Vilhelm Holck (1856-1936). Holch also added a frontispiece to the main wing.

In 1976 Søllerød Municipality, now part of Rudersdal Municipality, acquired the main building and after a Europa Nostra-awarded adaption into an exhibition space from 1979–83, Gl. Holtegaard opened to the public in 1982. In 1994 Gl. Holtegaard was taken over by Gl. Holtegaard-Breda Fonden, a foundation which now owns and operates the site.

== Gl. Holtegaard today ==
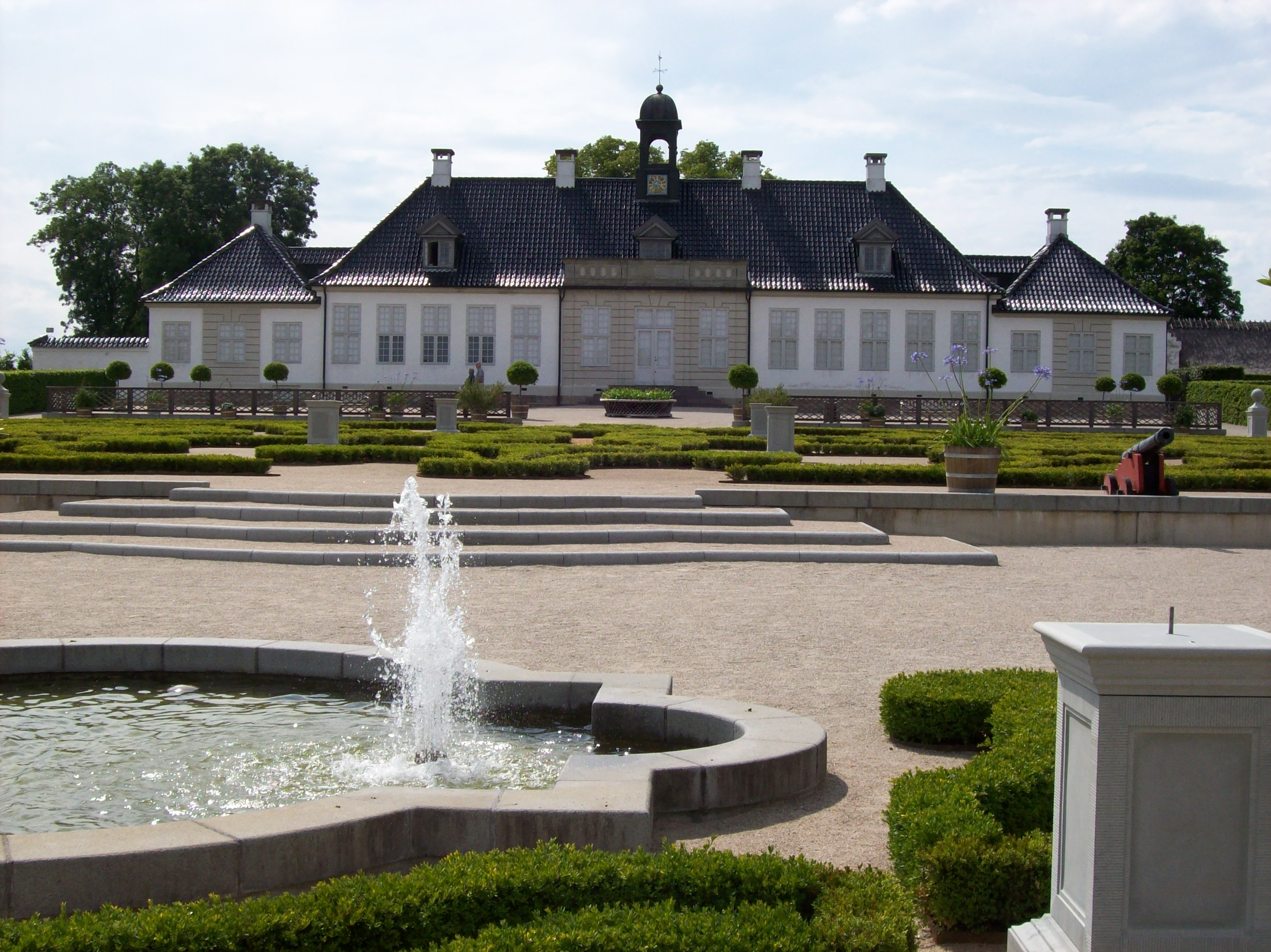
Gl. Holtegaard

From the outside, the main building appears largely as it did when it was completed in 1757, save the frontispiece added in 1900. The Baroque gardens were reconstructed in 2004. The lime tree avenues are those originally planted by de Thurah. A group of beech trees of an unusual cultivar with palmately lobed leaves is also from his day. Gl. Holtegaard is mainly a venue for temporary exhibitions. It also houses a local historic archive and a collection of Stone Age findings from nearby Vedbæk. The agricultural buildings and most of the land was sold off in 1897. It was acquired by Søllerød Municipality in 1934 and has since 1975 been used for a golf course among other things.

== Vedbæk Finds ==
Gl. Holtegaard also houses the findings from the Vedbæk Finds archaeological site (Bøgebakken gravplads), a Mesolithic cemetery of the Ertebølle culture. The cemetery is located in the northern part of the Maglemosen peat bog, and was discovered in 1975 during excavation for the new Vedbæk School. It should not be confused with the earlier Maglemosian culture, named for a different Maglemose near Slagelse.

An example of the findings of this culture cemetery include the bodies of a young woman with a necklace made of teeth, and her newborn baby. The child is cradled in the wing of a swan with a flint knife at its hip. The child's grave goods suggest that the culture involved ascribed status – the passing of power between generations. The brief statistical findings of the cemetery are as follows; 22 individual bodies (4 newborns), 17 of the adults buried could be aged - 8 died before reaching the age of 20. There were 9 men, 5 of them over the age of 50, and 8 women: 2 died before the age of 20, 3 living to over 40. Two women died in childbirth (including the young woman mention above) and were buried with their newborns beside them. Infant mortality rate is around 35%. Mortality rate is 50%. Reasons for these high death rates could be physiological or cultural.

The Vedbæk Finds is a part of Rudersdal Museerne.

== In popular culture ==
Gl. Holtegaard is used as a location in the films Tre piger fra Jylland (1957) and Soldaterkammerater på efterårsmanøvre (1961).

== List of owners ==
- 1697 J.B. Clodi
- 1719-1724 W.B. Clodi
- 1724-1735 Rasmus Rasmussen
- 1735-1742 Karen Soelgaard
- 1742-1755 Jørgen Lassen
- 1755-1760 Lauritz de Thurah
- 1760 Chr. Ditlev Reventlow
- 1760-1776 Johan Eilitz
- 1776-1794 Jacob Schnell
- 1794-1799 Adam Gottlob Wiihm
- 1799-1807 Knud Frederik Juel
- 1807-1808 Johannes Mehldahl
- 1808-1816 Mægler J.C.F. Gandil
- 1816-1830 Ritmester Ernst David Recke
- 1830-1834 Johannes Jung
- 1834-1845 Louise Augusta Jung
- 1845-1855 Carl Philip Holm
- 1855-1866 Frantz Peter Hagen
- 1866-1872 Frederik Gottschalck Knuth
- 1872-1882 Lars Trolle
- 1882-1900 Erhardt Kogsbølle
- 1900-1911 Hans Niels Andersen
- 1911-1943 Axel S. Dahl
- 1943-1947 Holger Schrøder
- 1947-1950 Asger Schmidt
- 1950-1973 N.J.H. Suhr
- 1973-1976 Søllerød Golf Club
- 1976-1993 Søllerød Municipality
- 1993- Gl. Holtegaard-Breda Fonden

== See also ==
- Mothsgården

== Other sources ==
- Gl. Holtegaard FKD

== Related reading ==
- Svend E Albrethsen; Erik Brinch Petersen (1975) Gravene på Bøgebakken, Vedbæk (Historisk topografisk Selskab for Søllerød Kommun)
