= Søllerød Kro =

Restaurant in Copenhagen, Denmark

Coordinates: 55.8135°N 12.4952°E

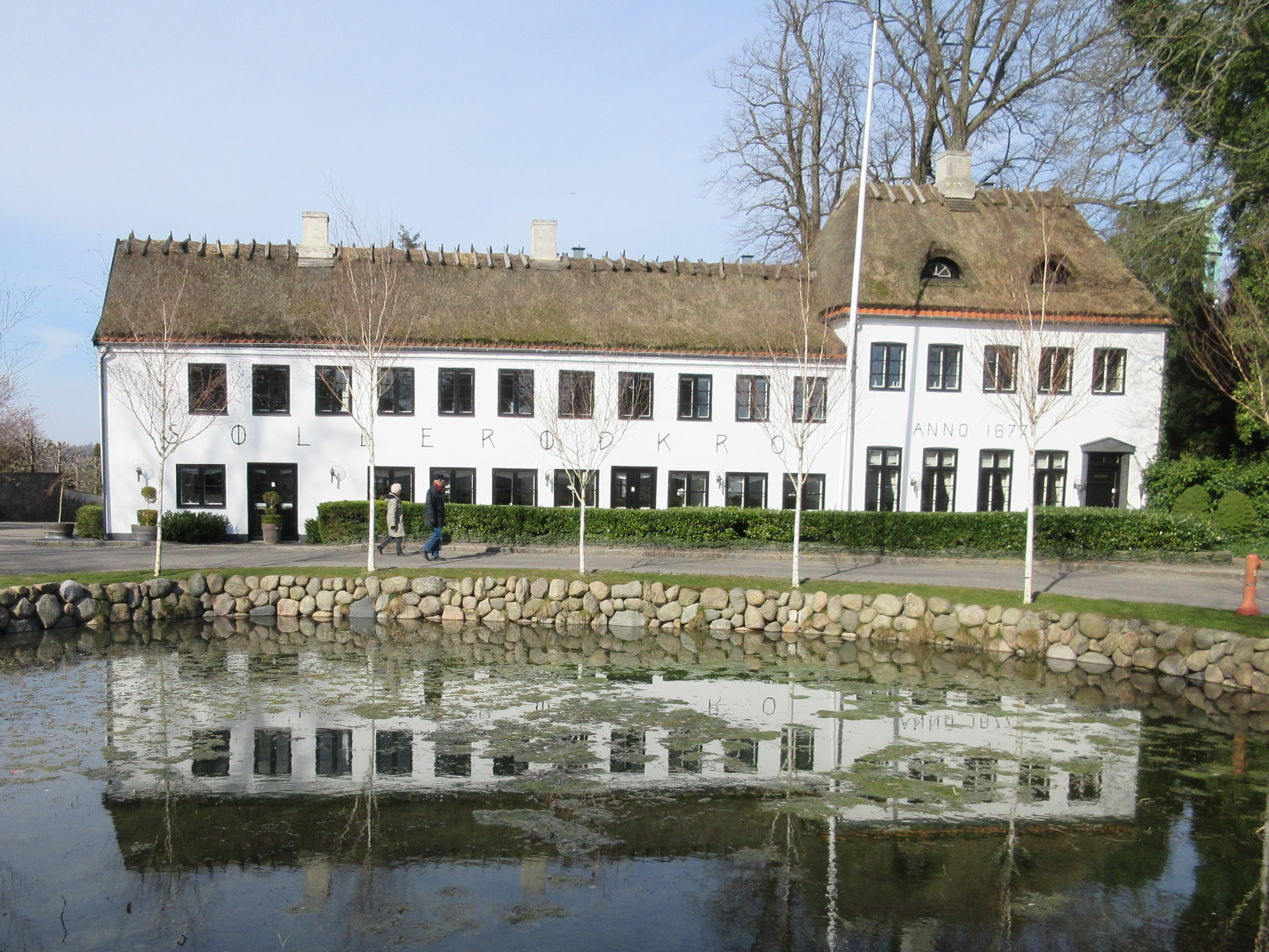
Søllerød Kro

Søllerød Kro is a one Michelin star restaurant in Søllerød, Rudersdal Municipality, in the northern suburbs of Copenhagen, Denmark. The restaurant building is an old inn from 1677 which faces the local village pond. It was listed in 1964.

== History ==
Søllerød Kro was opened by the pastor at the local Søllerød Church after he had obtained a license from the king. In the 1980s, the restaurant established a reputation as one of the best in Denmark. Since then the kitchen has been headed by some of the most well-known chefs in the country, including Søren Gericke, Michel Michaud, Francis Cardenau, Jan Petersen and Paul Cunningham. Jakob de Neergaard took over the kitchen in 2001 and with him as a head chef the restaurant received its first star in the Michelin Guide in 2007. He was succeeded by Christian Ebbe. Brian Mark Hansen took over the position as head chef in 2013.

== In popular culture ==
The inn is used as a location in the films Tag til Rønneby kro (1941), Bruden fra Dragstrup (1955), Soldaterkammerater på efterårsmanøvre (1961) and Tænk på et tal (1969).
