= Hoje =

Hoje or variants may refer to:

== Geography ==
- Höje River (Swedish: Höje å), a river in Scania in southern Sweden
- Høje Gladsaxe (Gladsaxe Heights), a housing project in Copenhagen, Denmark
- Høje Sandbjerg, part of Søllerød Naturpark in Rudersdal Municipality, Copenhagen, Denmark
- Høje-Taastrup Municipality, eastern Denmark
  - Høje Taastrup station, a railway station in Høje-Taastrup municipality, Denmark
- Lindholm Høje (Lindholm Hills), a Viking burial site, Aalborg

== Film and TV ==
- Hoje (film), a 2011 Brazilian film
- Jornal Hoje, a news program aired by the Brazilian television broadcaster Rede Globo

== Music ==
- Hoje (Ludmilla album), 2014
- Hoje (Os Paralamas do Sucesso album)
- Hoje, am album by Gal Costa
- Hoje É o Primeiro Dia do Resto da Sua Vida, by Rita Lee
