= Mothsgården =

Local history museum in Denmark

Coordinates: 55.8132°N 12.4943°E

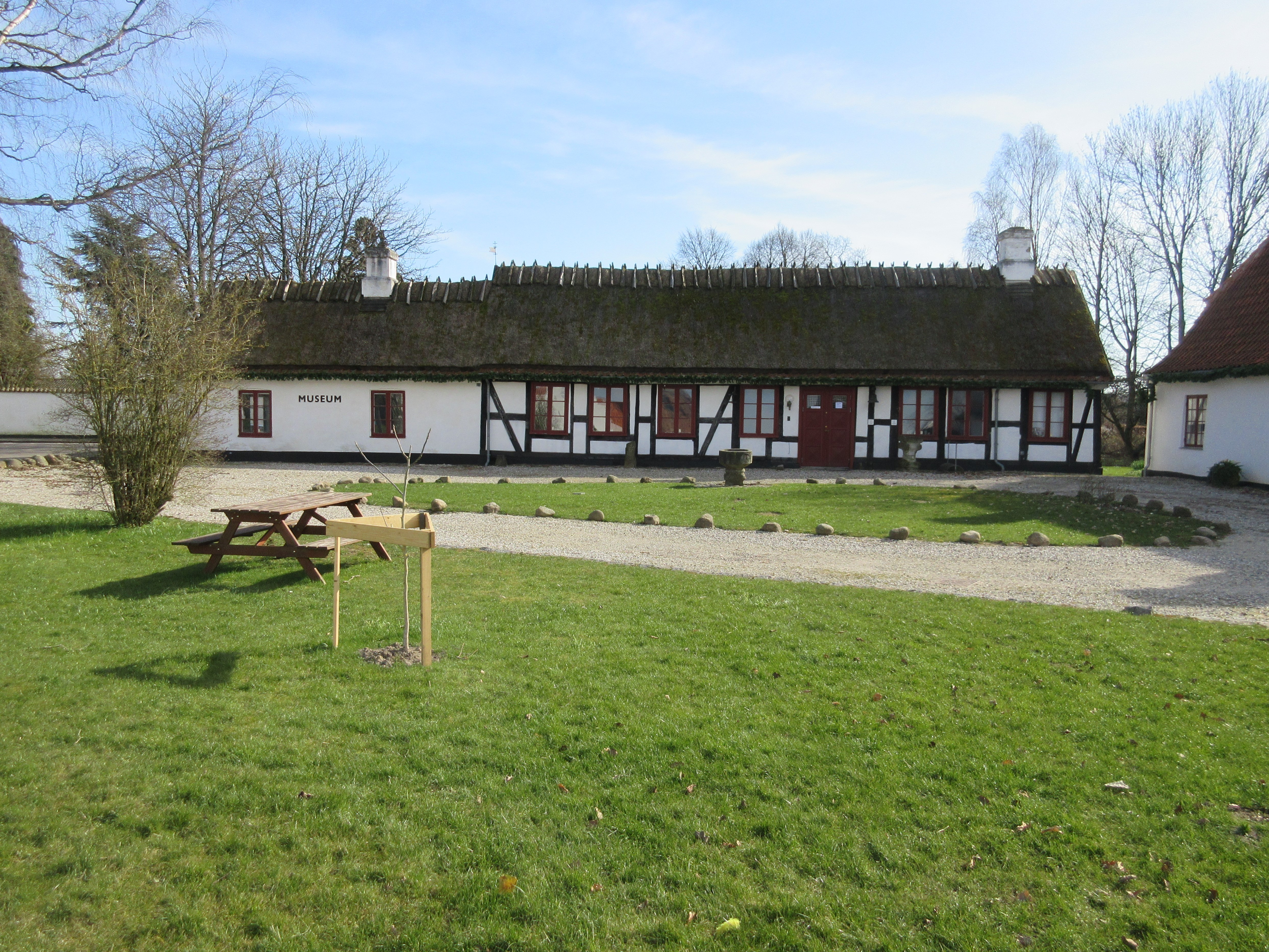
Mothsgården in Søllerød

Mothsgården is a former country retreat in Søllerød in the northern suburbs of Copenhagen, Denmark. It now houses the main branch of Rudersdal Museum, a local history museum for Rudersdal Municipality. The museum also comprises the Vedbæk Finds, a collection of archeological finds from Vedbæk, now on display in Gammel Holtegård, and the Rudersdal Local Historic Archives in Rudersdal Library.

== History ==
Mothsgård was built by Mathias Moth. He owned the property until 1719. Up through the 18th and 19th century, the house was owned by different families.

== Architecture ==
The property is a three-winged complex surrounding a central yard. It was listed in 1970.

== Edvard Grieg Memorial Plaque ==
A memorial plaque on the side of the building facing the village pond commemorates the Norwegian composer Edvard Grieg's composition of his Piano Concerto in A minor during a visit to Mothsgården in the summer of 1868 (Her i Mothsgaarden / komponerede / Edvard Grieg / i sommeren 1868 / koncerten for klaver / og orkester / Søllerød Kommune satte dette minde 1868). Grieg often visited Denmark, where he had lived from 1863 to 1866 and where his mother had family (Hagerup). In 1867, he married his Danish cousin Nina Hagerup in Copenhagen. In 1868, the couple returned to Denmark to present their newborn daughter, Alexandra. Grieg stayed at Mothsgården while his wife and daughter stayed with relatives in Copenhagen.
