= Johanne Hesbeck =

Danish photographer (1873–1927)

Ida Johanne Hesbeck
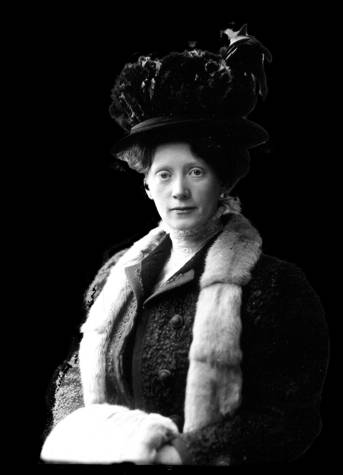
- Self-portrait
- Born: September 2, 1873. Varde, Denmark
- Died: March 25, 1927 (aged 53); Holte, Denmark

Ida Johanne Hesbeck (2 September 1873 – 25 March 1927) was a Danish photographer. From 1915 to 1927, she ran a successful portrait studio in Holte, north of Copenhagen.

== Biography ==
Born in Varde, Jutland, Hesbeck was the daughter of a merchant, Christoffer Johannes Hesbeck. She trained as a photographer under Peter Elfelt, who employed her from 1905 to 1914. In 1914, she moved to Søllerød Municipality, where she opened a business on Esthersvej, Ny Holte, in a property she later purchased. She produced portraits and on occasion contributed to the local newspaper, Søllerød Tidende. After she died in Holte in 1927, her business was taken over by the photographer Ella Bach, who ran it until the late 1970s.

In the early 1980s, when the building was due to be demolished, a large collection of Hesbeck's photographs was found. Consisting of some four thousand 12 × 8 cm photographic plates as well as around four hundred 16.5 × 12 negatives taken from 1915 to 1927, the photographs consist mainly of individual portraits and groups. There were also some 300 stereoscope negatives of various sizes taken between 1895 and 1915. All her works are clearly identified with a number corresponding to the order, with the name and address of the person portrayed. While generally quite traditional, her photographs are of a high quality. Some benefitted from artificial lighting and shadow effects. She also took a number of photographs of dogs.
