= Usserød Å =

Stream which is principal drainage of Sjælsø Lake in North Zealand, Denmark

Coordinates: 55.8912°N 12.4896°E

Usserød River
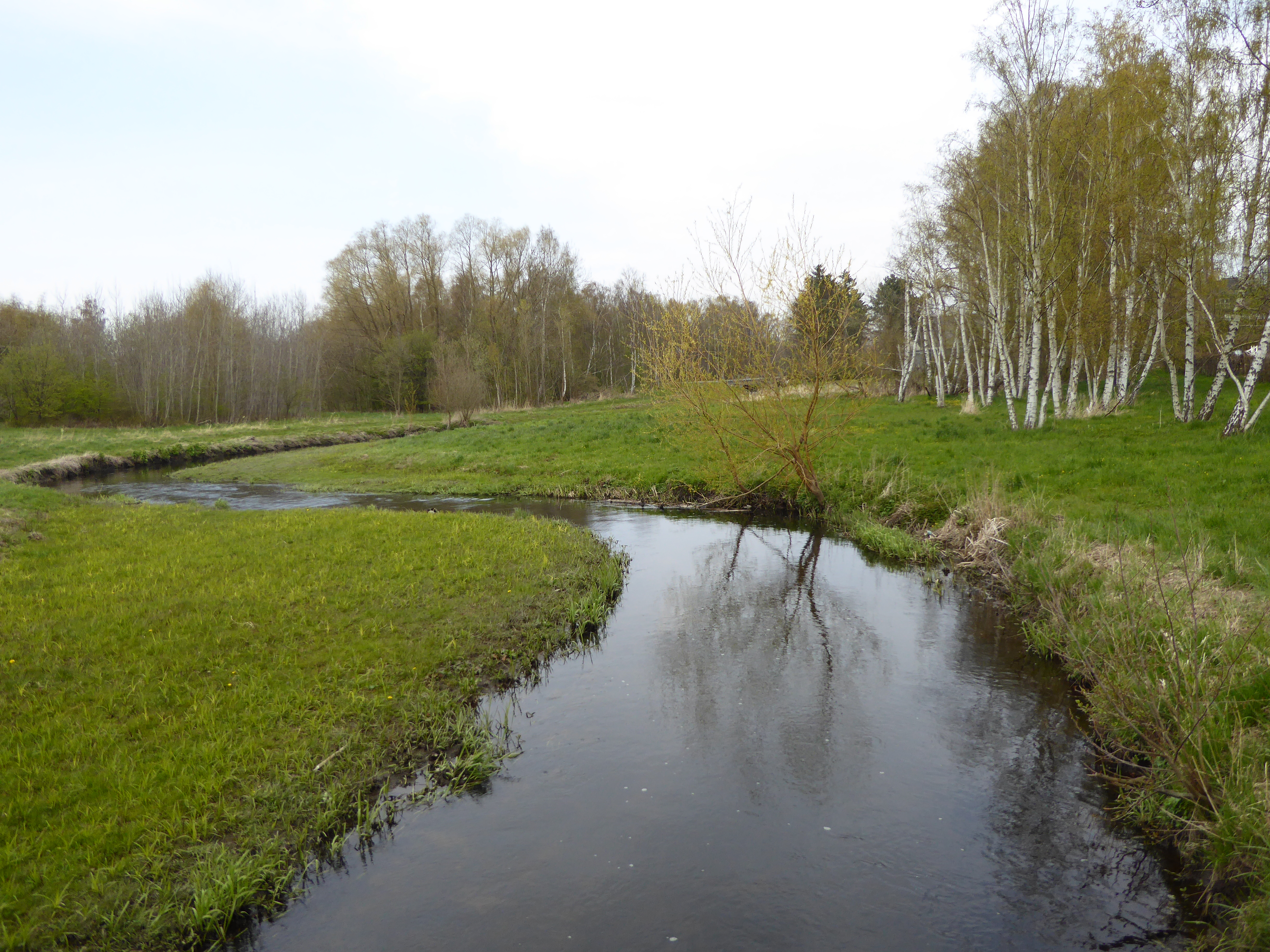
- Usserød Å north of Kokkedal
- Native name: Usserød Å (Danish)

Location
- Country: Denmark
- Region: Zealand
- District: Capital Region
- Municipality: Rudersdal, Hørsholm, Fredensborg

Physical characteristics
- Source: Sjælsø
  - location: Rudersdal Municipality
- Mouth: Nive Å
  - location: Fredensborg Municipality
- Length: 9 km (5.6 mi)

Usserød Å, the principal drainage of Sjælsø Lake. is a stream in North Zealand to the north of Copenhagen, Denmark. It is approximately 9 kilometres long, drops 18 metres and is joined by Donse Å before itself flowing into Nive Å on its way to the Øresund at Nivå. It passes through the protected Usserød Ådal and the town of Hørsholm. Several watermills and early industrial sites are located along its course, the largest being Usserød Textile Mill.

== Course ==
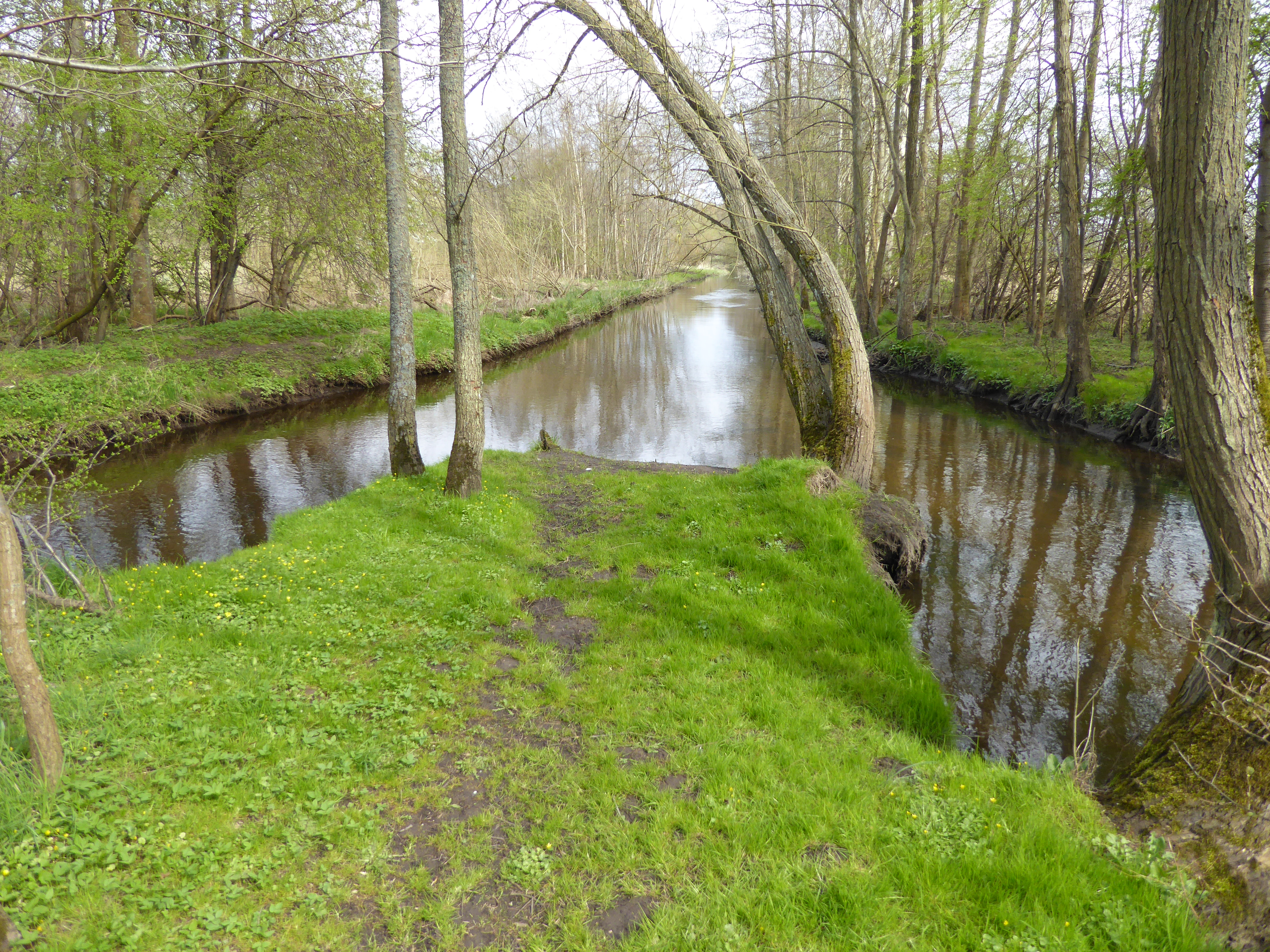
The point where Usserød Å (right) joins Nive Å (left), looking downstream

Usserød Å extends from the south side of Sjælsø Lake. Its first part is heavily regulated and runs through the outskirts of Birkerød, Eskemose Skov and the Istedrød area. It then passes under the Helsingør Motorway and continues through the protected Usserød Ådal (Usserød Valley) at Mortenstrup before entering a suburban neighbourhood just north of Kokkedal station. Usserød Å then passes the three mill ponds Stanpedammen, Frederiksdam and Mølledammen before joining Nive Å at Nive Watermill.

== History ==
The first watermills were built along the stream in the beginning of the 18th century. Usserød Textile Mill was established in 1791. It was taken over by the state in 1802 and used for manufacturing textiles for military uniforms. Other watermills and industrial complexes along the stream include Stampen, Nyværk (demolished in 1925), Usserød Watermill, Brønsholmdal Factory and Nive Watermill.

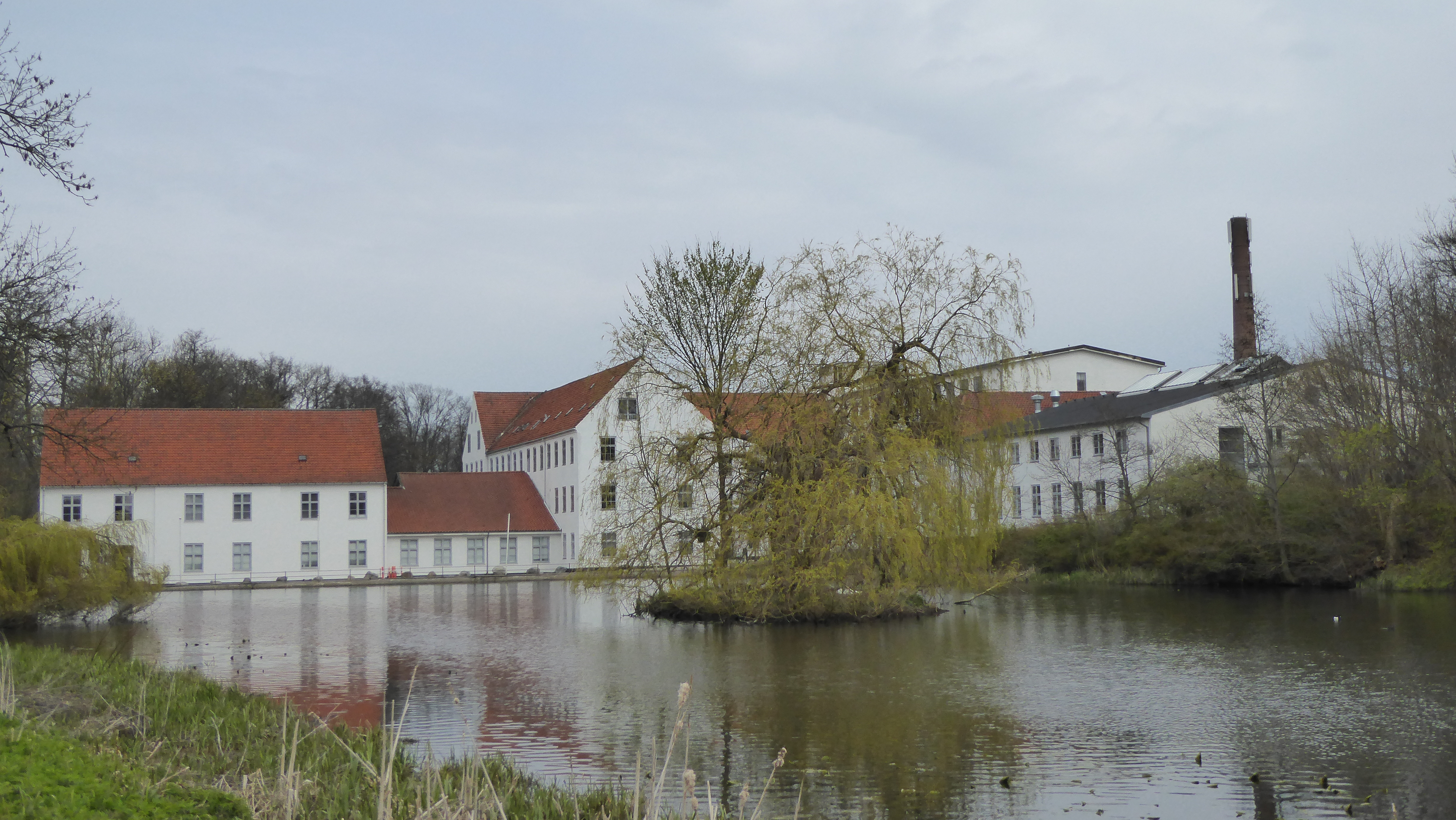
Usserød Textile Factory

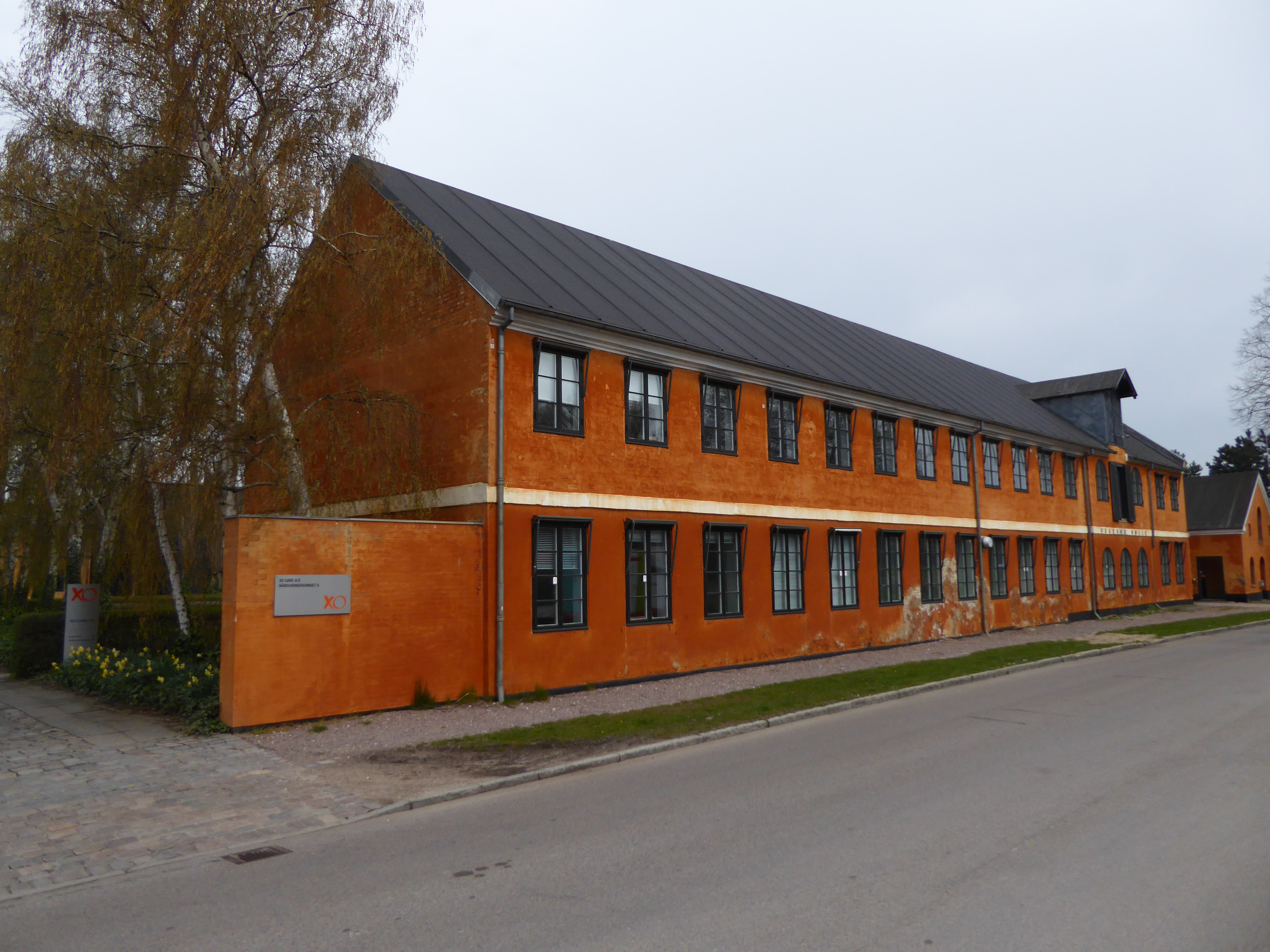
Usserød Watermill

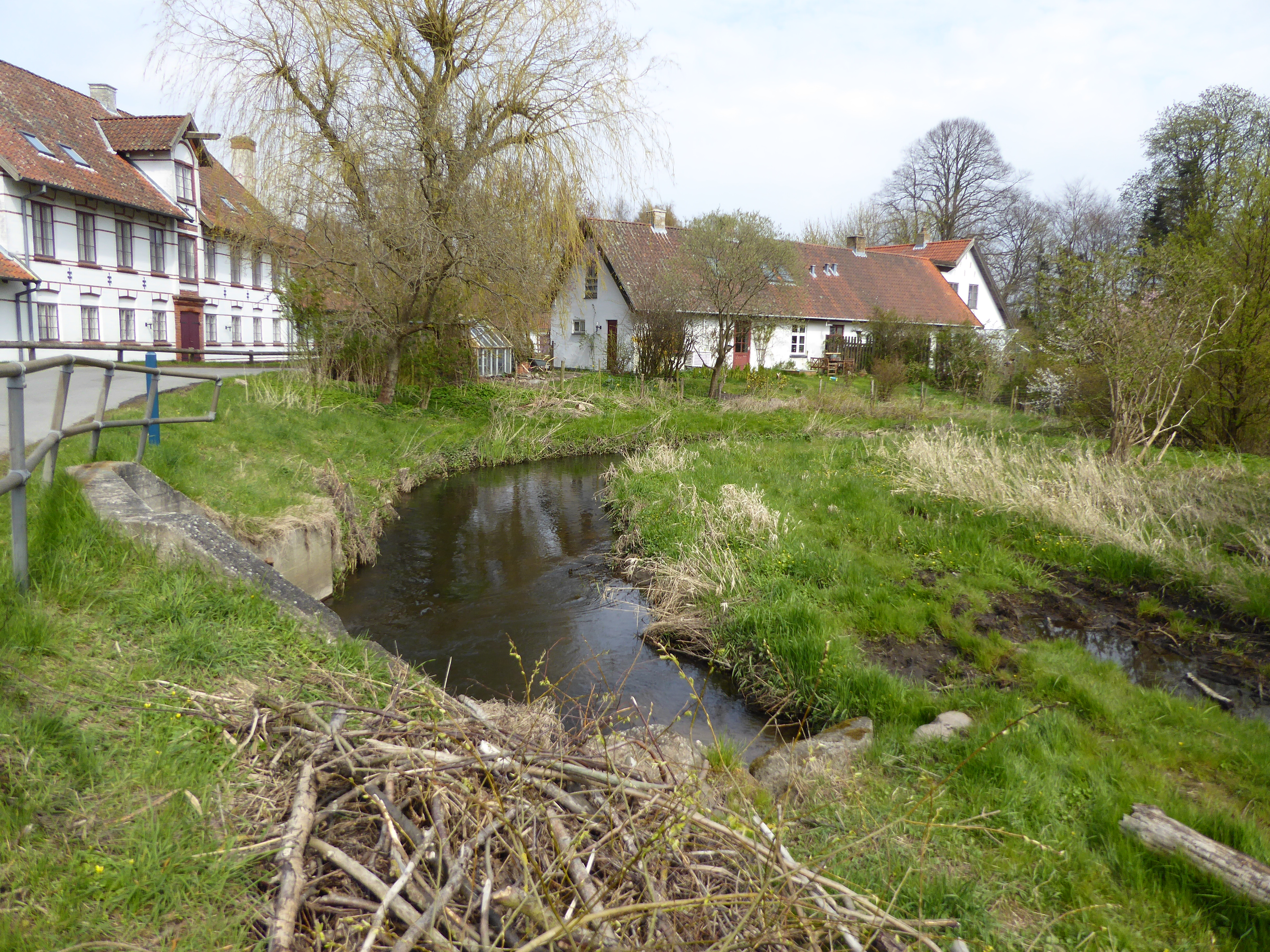
Nive Watermill

== See also ==
- Mølleåen
