= Lyngby Kongevej =

Road in Denmark

Secondary Route 201
- Sekundærrute 201

Route information
- Length: 24 km (15 mi)

Major junctions
- South end: Kongens Lyngby
- North end: Hillerød

Location
- Country: Denmark

Highway system
- Transport in Denmark; Motorways

Secondary route 201 (Danish: Sekundærrute 201) is a numbered road in North Zealand to the north of Copenhagen, Denmark, consisting of Lyngby Omfartsvej, a motorway bypass avoiding Lyngby Hovedgade (Lyngby Main Street), and Kongevejen which links Kongens Lyngby in the south with Hillerød in the north by way of Holte, Birkerød and Blovstrød. The road originates in a royal road which was built in 1587 between Copenhagen and Frederiksborg Castle, Frederick II's new North Zealand residence. The southern part of the road has now been replaced by Lyngbyvej and the southernmost portion of Helsingør Motorway (before 2005. Lyngby Motorway).

== Route ==
Lyngby Omfartsvej is the direct continuation of Lyngbyvej, diverging from Helsingør Motorway just south of Vintapper Sø and running west of central Kongens Lyngby. Kongevejen follows an almost straight line and is locally officially known as Lyngby Kongevej (Lyngby Royal Road) in Lyngby-Taarbæk Municipality, Birkerød Kongevej (Birkerød Royal Road) in Rudersdal Municipality, Kongevejen (in Allerød Municipality and Københavns Vej (Copenhagen Road) in Hillerød Municipality.

== History ==
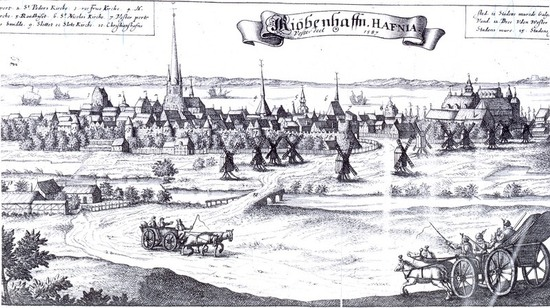
Carriage of the type that was used on the royal roads arriving at Copenhagen in 1587

Lyngby Kongevej was the first of a number of royal roads created by Frederick II and his successor Christian IV. The royal roads were reserved for the king and his men, including the royal mail coaches and couriers. The roads were protected by locked boom gates. Unauthorized use of the roads was originally sanctioned with confiscation of horses, carriage and load and later with half a year of forced labour at Bremerholm or Spindehuset. Remains of the original road can still be seen in Rude Skov and Geels Skov.

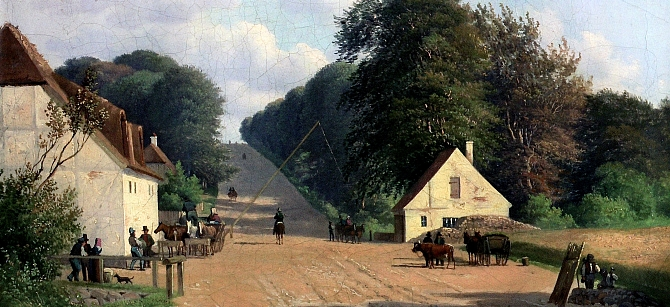
The King's Road (Kongevejen) at Geel's Hill, Holte. Painting by Andreas Juuel

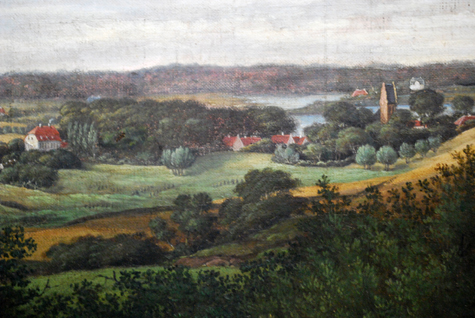
Kongevejen at Lyngby in about 1820. The building to the leeft is "Det Hvide Palæ" (The White House) which still exist todayJuuel

The road was created in 1584 to provide an easy link between Copenhagen and Frederick's new Frederiksborg Castle, and it was later extended to reach Fredensborg and Helsingør. It began at Vibenhus and followed a straight line to Hillerød, through the marshy areas at present day Holte and the extensive royal forests south of Hillerød including Store Dyrehave which was enclosed with stone walls in 1619–28.

The road was opened to the public as a toll road in the 1767. This was done to finance an upgrade of the road by the French road engineer Jean Marmillod who was brought to Denmark by state secretary J. H. E. von Bernstorff to improve the road system in and around Copenhagen. The new road between Vibenhus and Fredensborg was completed in 1775.

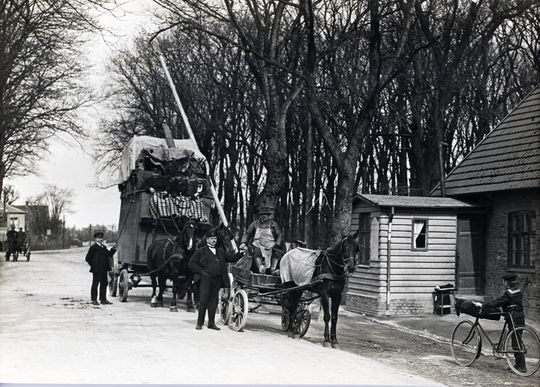
The boom gate at Emdrup Lake on 31 May 1915, one day before the fee for use of the road was abolished

The road stretch today known as Lyngby Hovedgade was partly built over with houses in the 1780s. Ny Holte Kro (New Holte Inn) at the foot of Geel's hill in present-day Holte also opened in the 1780s but apart from that the area along the northern part of Lyngby Kongevej saw little development but apart from the Kongevejen still passed through open countryside this far north. Even after the opening of the Nordbanen railway line with stations at Holte and Birkerød in 1864, it lasted until the turn of the century before the area was built over with houses, some of which were replaced by apartment buildings in the 1930s.

Lyngby Kongevej remained a toll road until 1 June 1915. Lyngbyvej, the southern part of the original road, has been expanded several times to cope with increasing car traffic. The southern part of the Helsingør Motorway was called the Lyngby Motorway until 2005.

== Landmarks ==
A number of old milestones, representing different periods, can be seen along the road. The oldest date from Ole Rømer's time.

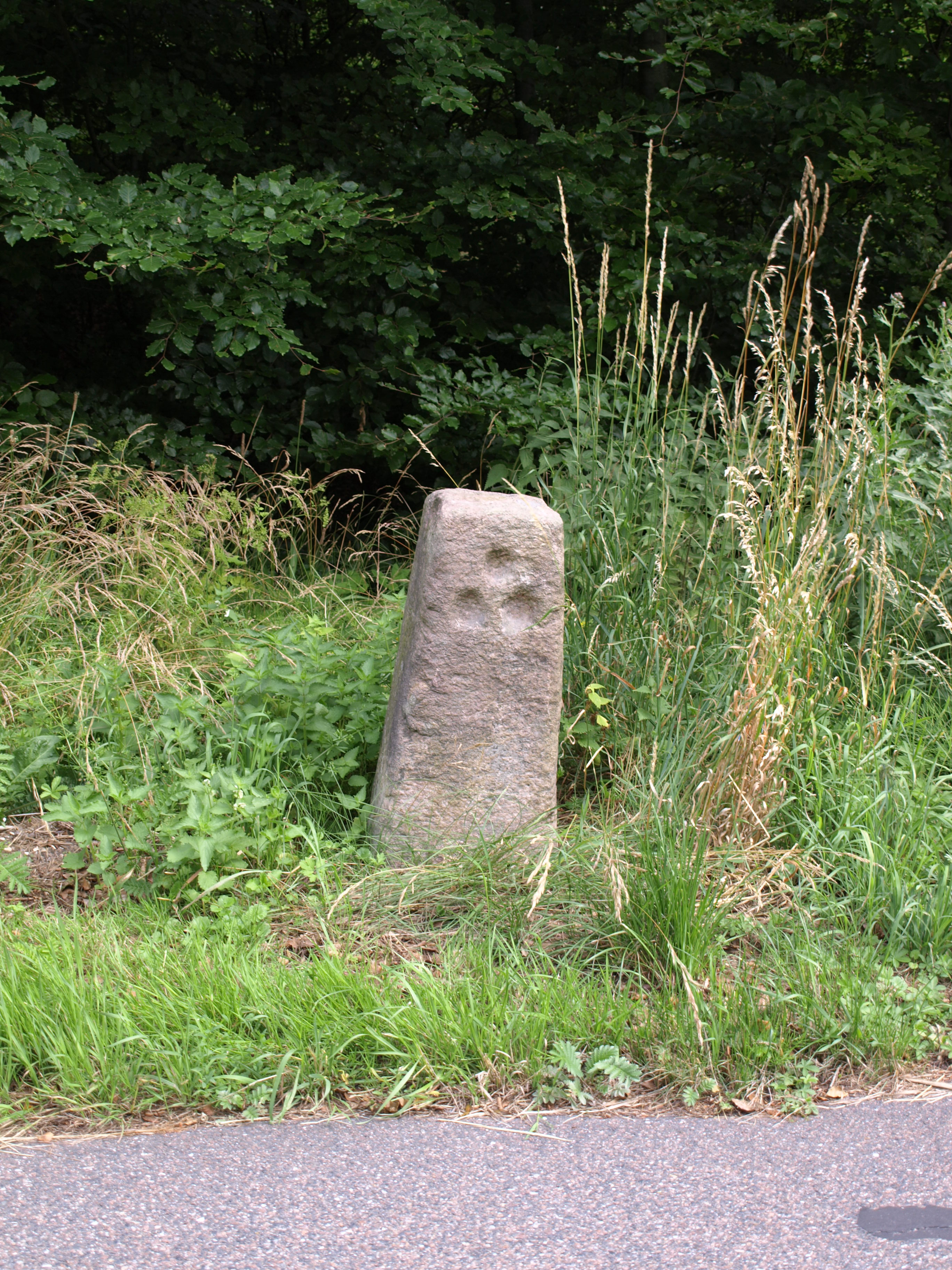
3/4milestone from Ole Rømer's time

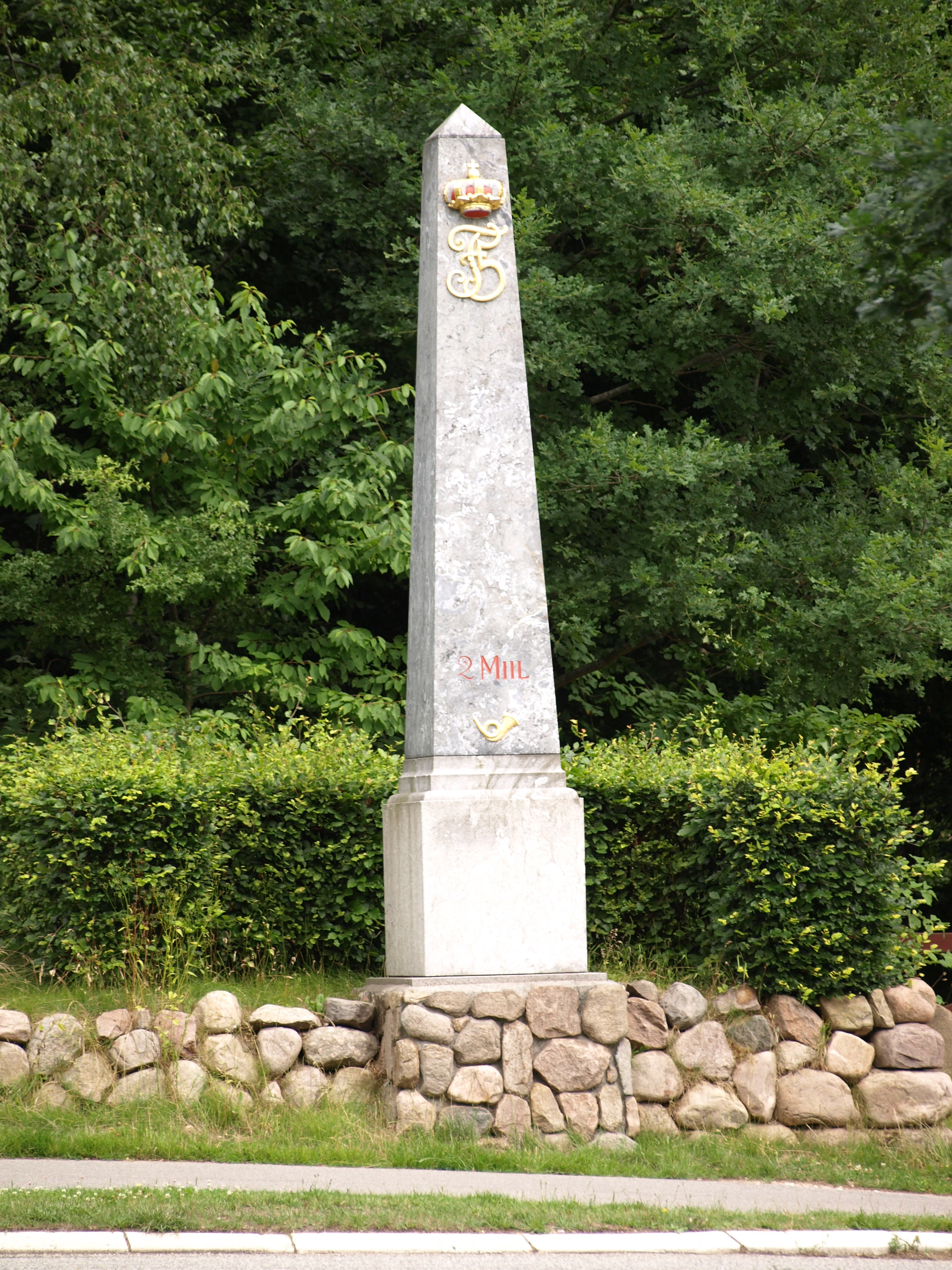
Milestone of Norwegian marble on Geel's Hill: 2 Danish miles from Copenhagen Inscription:

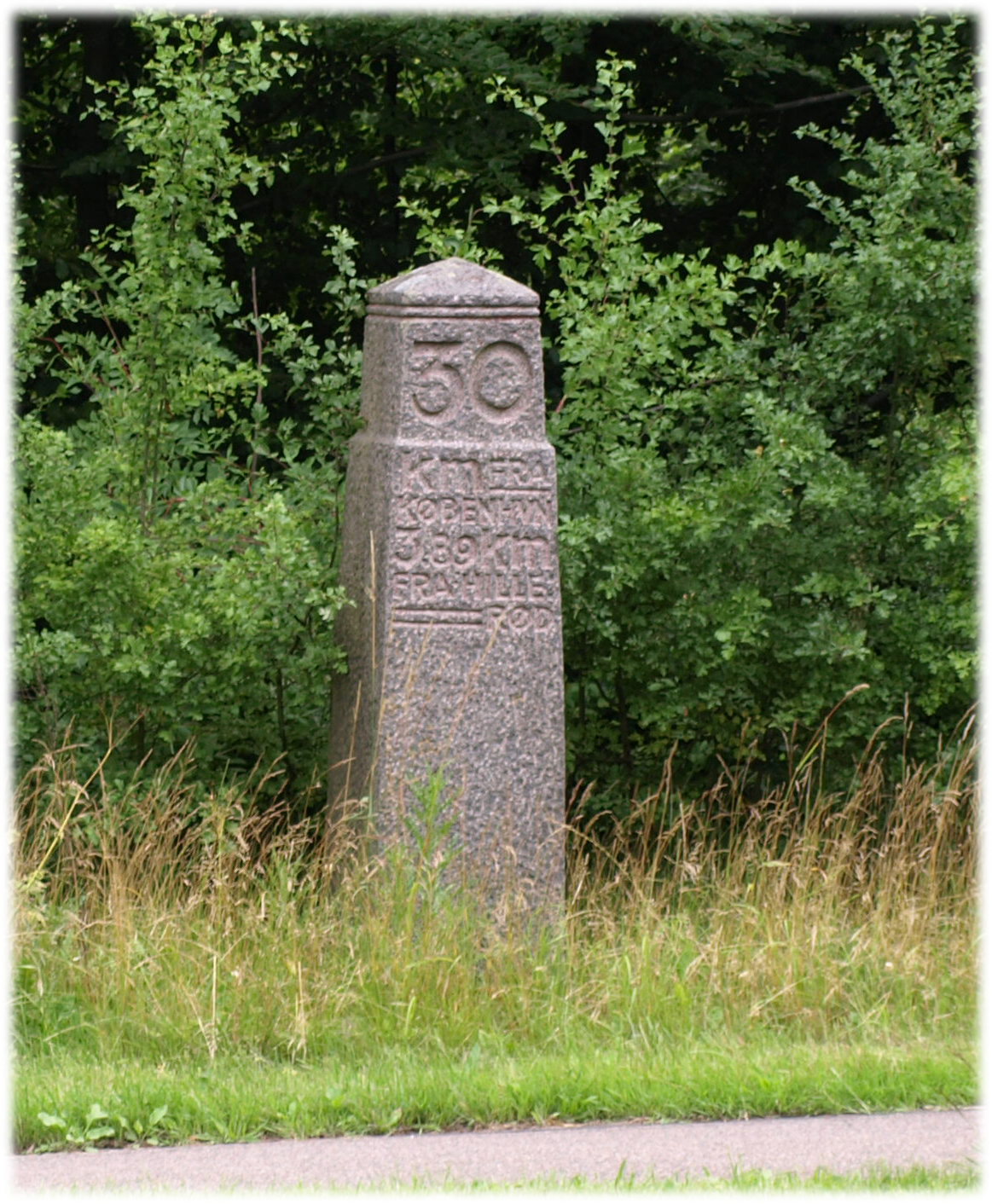
Kilometre stone located 30 km from Copenhagen and 3.98 km from

== See also ==
- Roskildevej
