= Henning Petersen =

Danish cyclist (born 1939)

Personal information
- Born: 3 September 1939 (age 87) Søllerød, Denmark

Cycling career
- Sport: Cycling

Henning Petersen (born 3 September 1939) is a Danish former cyclist. Petersen was born in Copenhagen and his profession was a driver. His sporting career began with 1.C.C. Copenhagen. He competed in the team time trial at the 1964 Summer Olympics.
