= Usserød Textile Factory =

Danish textile factory

Coordinates: 55°53′48″N 12°29′37″E

Usserød Textile Factory (Danish: Usserød Klædefabrik) is a listed, 19th-century industrial complex at Usserød Å in the Usserød district of Hørsholm, Denmark. It was from 1802 home to the Royal Military Textile Factory (Danish: Den Kongelige Militære Klædefabrik) which remained in use until 1981. The buildings have now been renovated and are now used as a business park.

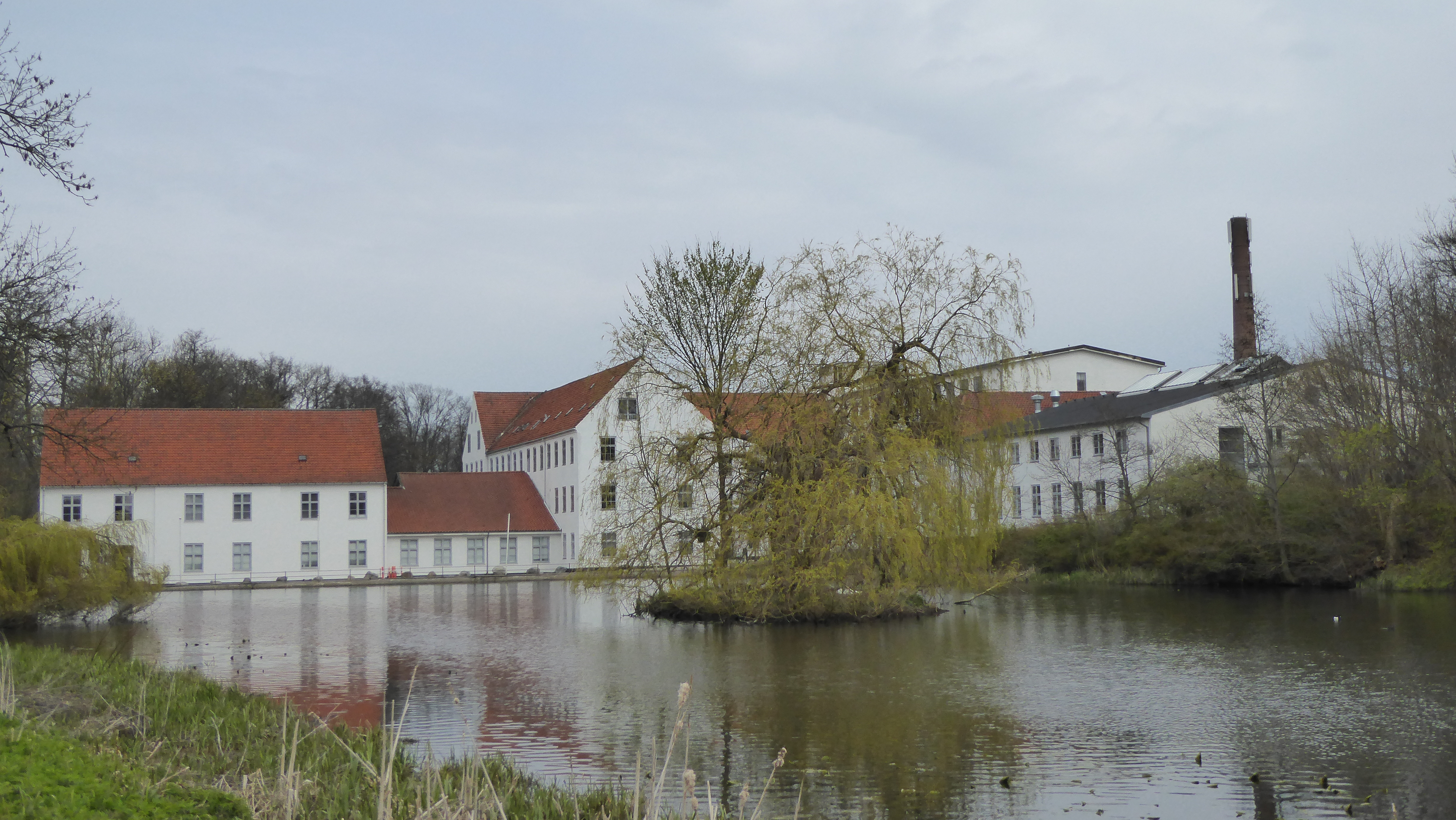
Usserød Klædefabrik

== History ==
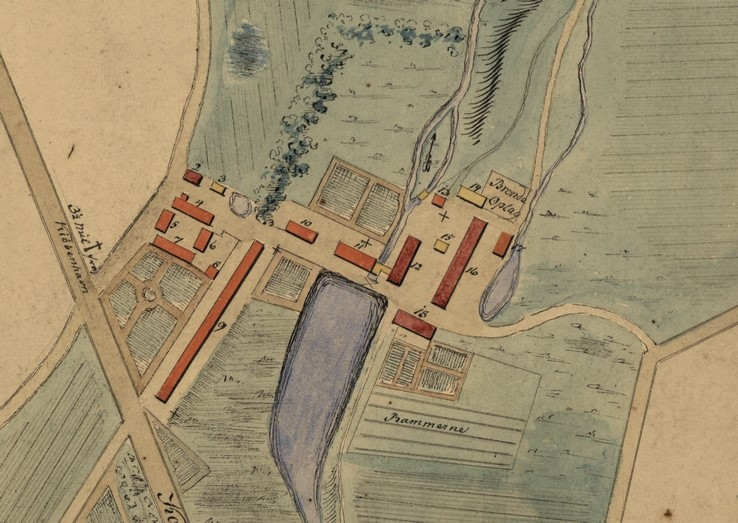
Part od the factory site in a detail from a plan from 1815.

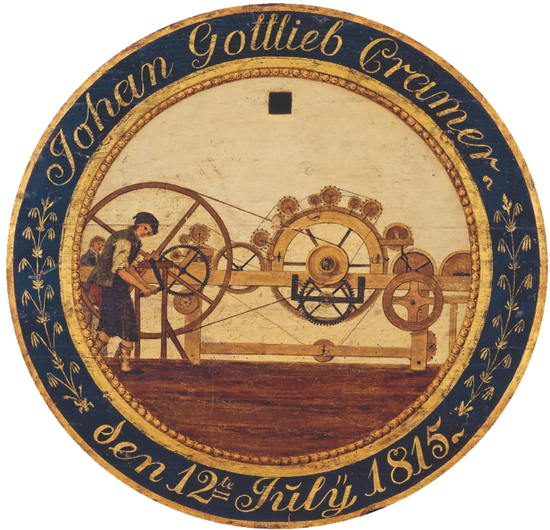
Children at work in the Royal Military Textile Factory in Usserød, seen on Johan Gottlieb Cramber's ceremonial target from the Royal Copenhagen Shooting Society.

The first textile mill at the site was established by a private consortium in 1791. They had previously unsuccessfully applied for a royal license to build a textile mill on Mølleåen. In 1802 it was taken over by the state and from 1809 used for manufacturing textiles for military uniforms. From 1815, it completely replaced the Royal Military Textile Manufactury on Rigensgade in Copenhagen which was converted into a new garrison hospital. When the production peaked in 1814, Usserød Textile Mill produced more than 90,000 metres of textiles and employed 700 workers half of which were children.

The Danish military began to move its textile production to Ryvangen Barracks in the 1970s and the factory in Usserød closed in 1981. The buildings were left empty until they were sold to Jakob and Erik B. Lyngsø in 1985. The architect Jørgen Raaschou-Nielsen was subsequently responsible for a renovation which received the Europa Nostra Award in 1987,

== Architecture ==
The three-winged Late Neoclassical main building surrounds a central courtyard in a style remniscient of a Baroque-style manor house although it lacks its symmetry. The three wings date from 1803, 1860 and 1950 respectively. The central Spinnery Wing is decorated with a triangular pediment.

Two buildings are found to the north of the main building. One of them is from 1888 and used to serve as a combined machine and boilerhouse. It stands in blank, red brick walls with arched windows and a roof with Polonceau trues. The other one is from 1939 and was used for weaving and cutting of textiles. To the east of the main building stands the Dyeing Building from 1889. It is a yellow K-shaped brick building with cornice and licenes in grey cement. Ut has a barrelvaulted roof supported by cast iron pillars. To the west of the main building stands two attached buildings (1868 og 1864). The building to the south of the main building ("Forbygningen"), on the other side of Fabriksvej, is from 1865.

== Today ==
A number of companies are now based in the buildings. The property also comprises 8.5 hectares of park and woodland that is open to the public.
