= Ravnsnæs =

Village near Sjælsø, Denmark

Coordinates: 55°51′43.26″N 12°27′26.03″E

Ravnsnæs is a small village with a population of 584 (1 January 2026), just south of Sjælsø in Denmark. Ravnsnæs is part of the Rudersdal Municipality, and is situated 3.5 km South West of Hørsholm.

Watch pictures and fly-over video at landowner's website.
