= Øverød =

Neighbourhood in Denmark

Coordinates: 55°49′14″N 12°29′19″E

Øverød is a suburban neighborhood situated on the north side of Søllerød Lake in Holte, Rudersdal Municipality, in the northern outskirts of Copenhagen, Denmark. The original village is now agglomerated with the modern district of Holte and the village of Søllerød, forming the northernmost part of Copenhagen's urban area. Øverød is bounded by Rude Forest on the west and Søllerød Naturpark on the east. It belongs to Holte postal district (2840 Holte).

== History ==
Øverød was originally an ancient village. The name is recorded in 1370-80 as Øbæruth, which is derived from the old Danish male name Ø̄pi and -rød, meaning "clearing in the forest" (rydning). Most of the modern neighbourhood of Øverød date from the years after 1959 when the road Borgmester Schneiders Vej was constructed.

== Landmarks ==
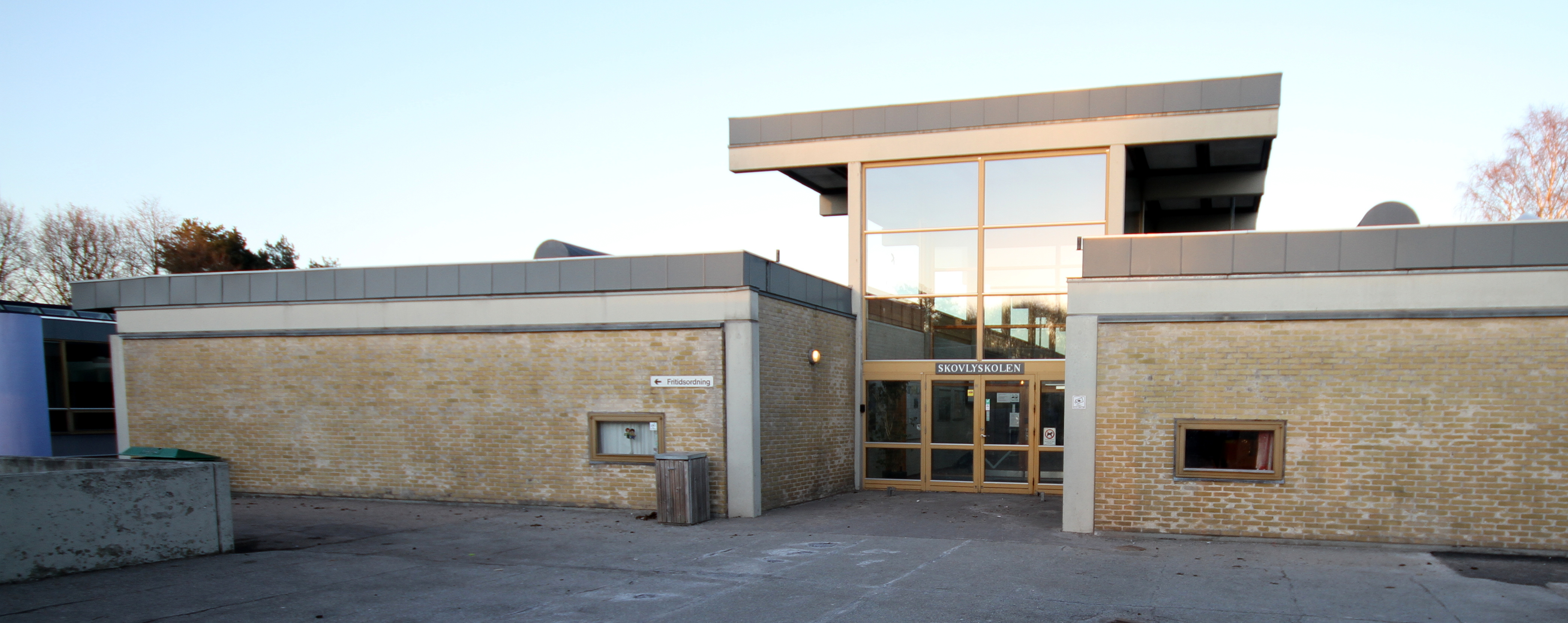
Skovly School, the local primary school

Skovly School (Skovlyskolen) on Borgmester Schneiders Vej was completed in 1970 to a design by Knud Munk, Halldor Gunnløgsson & Jørn Nielsen.

== Notable residents ==
- Peter Frederik Suhm (1728–1798) a Danish historian owned a country house in Øverød called Suhmsminde, which was demolished in 1959.
- Axel Olrik (1864–1917 in Øverød) a Danish folklorist and scholar of mediaeval historiography and a pioneer in the methodical study of oral narrative.
