= Søllerød Municipality =

Former municipality in Denmark

Coordinates: 55°49′N 12°31′E

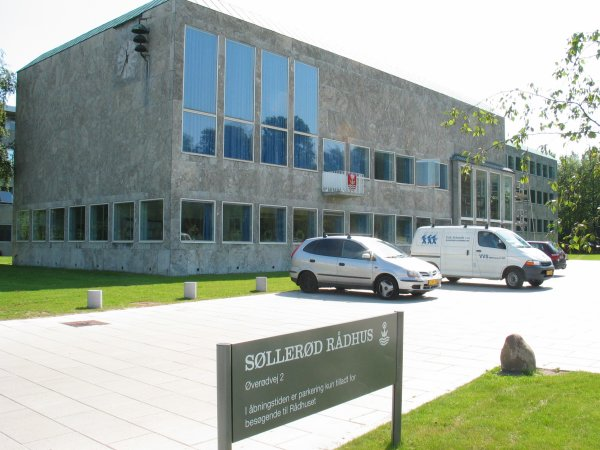
Søllerød Town Hall (1942) designed by Arne Jacobsen and Fleming Lassen

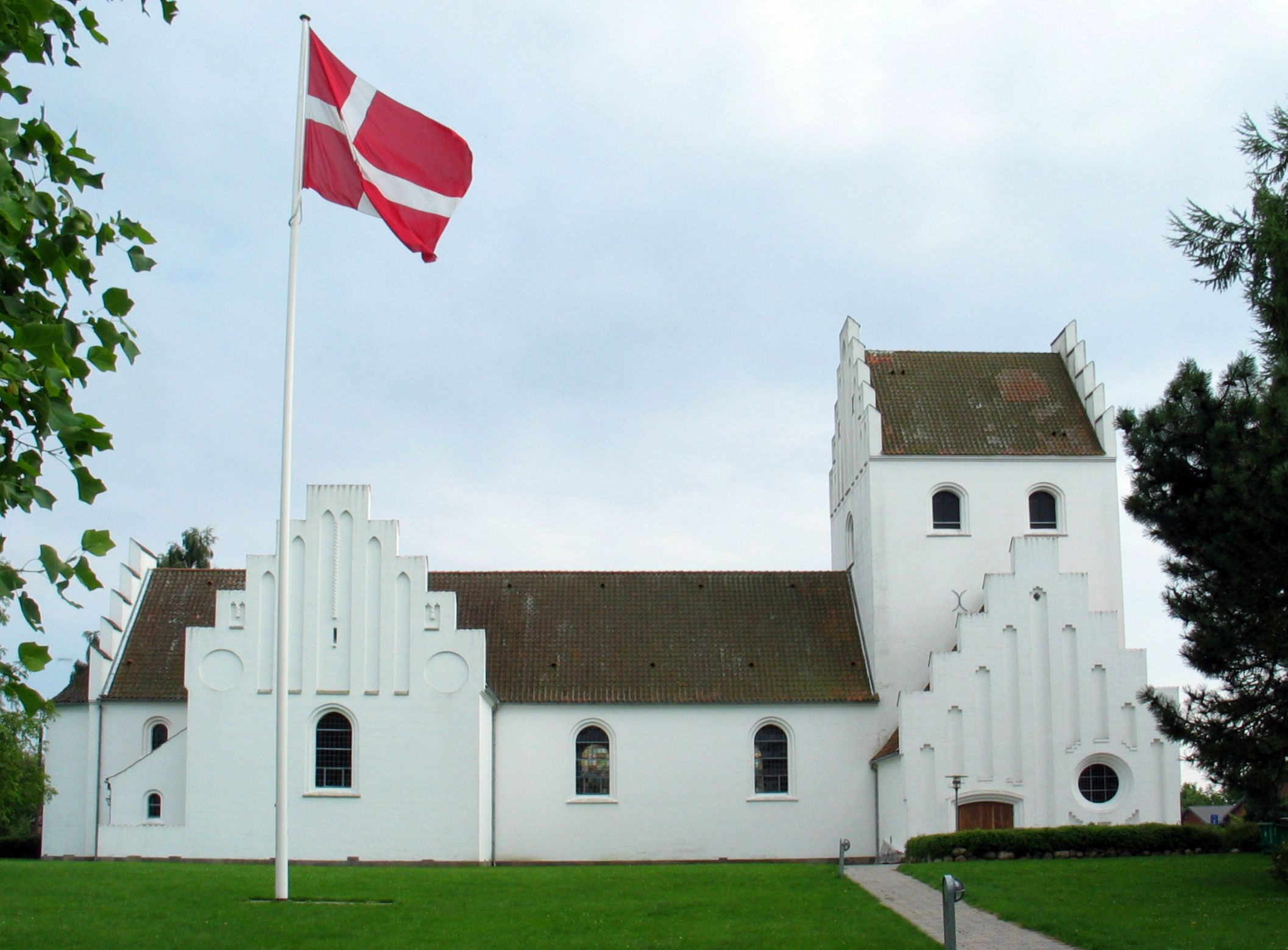
Holte Church as seen from the north. Holte, Denmark. ©2005 Hans Andersen.

Until 1 January 2007 Søllerød was a municipality (Danish, kommune) in Copenhagen County on the east coast of the island of Zealand (Sjælland) in eastern Denmark. The municipality covered an area of 39.77 km^{2}, and had a total population of 31,920 (2006). Its mayor was Erik Fabrin, a member of the Venstre (Liberal Party) political party.

== Overview ==
The main town and the site of its municipal council was the town of Holte. Other towns in the municipality were Gl. Holte, Nærum, Trørød, Vedbæk, Skodsborg, Søllerød and Øverød.

Søllerød municipality ceased to exist as the result of Kommunalreformen ("The Municipal Reform" of 2007). It was merged with Birkerød municipality to form the new Rudersdal municipality. This created a municipality with an area of 73 km^{2} and a total population of 53,621 (2005). The new municipality will belong to the new Region Hovedstaden ("Copenhagen Capital Region").

== Twin towns ==
- Haugesund, Norway
