= Søllerød Town Hall =

Building in Søllerød, Denmark

Coordinates: 55°48′39″N 12°28′29″E

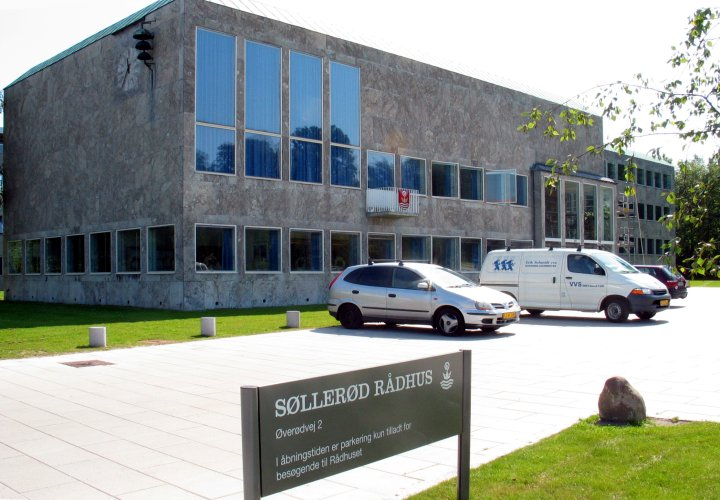
Rudersdal Town Hall

Søllerød Town Hall (Danish: Søllerød Rådhus), now renamed Rudersdal Town Hall, was built for the former Søllerød Municipality which in 2007 became part of Rudersdal Municipality, combining Søllerød and Birkerød. The building is located in Holte some 19 km to the north of Copenhagen's city centre. Designed by Danish architects Arne Jacobsen and Flemming Lassen, it was completed in 1942.

== Architecture ==
Like his Aarhus City Hall, Jacobsen's Søllerød Town Hall was inspired by the modernist Swedish architect Gunnar Asplund, especially his Functionalist extension to the City Hall in Gothenburg which was completed in 1936.

The complex consists of two staggered buildings. The main entrance, made almost completely of glass, is located on the corner of the front building and is complemented by the four large windows of the lofty council chamber diagonally across the facade to the west. The building contains meeting rooms on the first floor. An extension, completed in 1964 and also designed by Jacobsen, contains three floors of offices. Standing further back, it is connected to the original building with a glass corridor. The complex is built in reinforced concrete, faced in marble from Porsgrunn in Norway, with a copper-plated roof. The square windows are set flush to the outside. When it was opened in 1942, its chairs, desks, lamps and textiles were all designed by Arne Jacobsen. Examples can still be seen inside the building. Comprehensive restoration work was completed in 2003, taking full account of the original design and the materials used. In 1992, Søllerød Town Hall became the first building in Denmark built after 1900 to be given the status of a listed building.
