= Søllerød =

District of Copenhagen, Denmark

Coordinates: 55°49′N 12°31′E

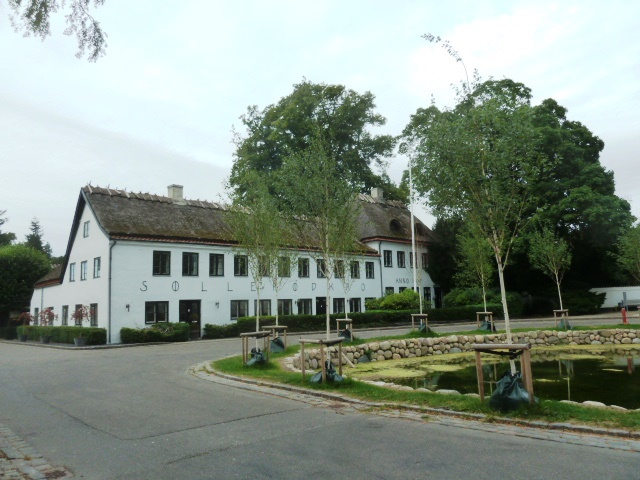
Søllerød Inn at the old village pond which forms the historic centre of the original village

Søllerød is a suburban district of Rudersdal Municipality in the northern outskirts of Copenhagen, Denmark. The original village, one of the oldest in the area, is perched on Søllerød Hill on the south side of Søllerød Lake. It merged with the neighbouring village of Øverød to the north and the modern district of Holte to the southwest in the middle of the 20th century and now forms part of the Greater Copenhagen area.

Most of the local landmarks are concentrated in a well-preserved village environment centred on the old village pond and on Søllerødvej (Søllerød Road). They include the medieval Søllerød Church, with a scenic cemetery, the famous Søllerød Inn, now a one-star Michelin restaurant, the old country house Mothsgården, now a local history museum, and a number of other 18th and 19th-century landmarks.

== History ==
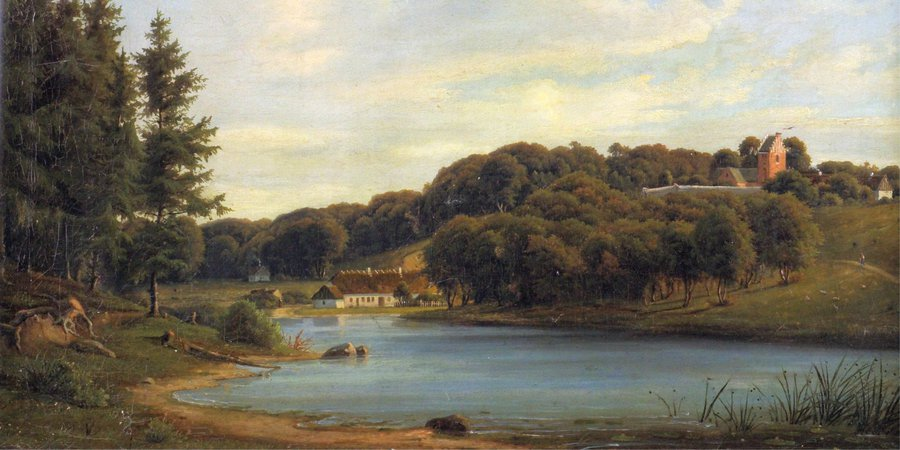
Søllerød Lake seen from Øverød with Søllerød Church in the background (c. 1895)

The name Søllerød, originally Sylueruth (1321–23), is derived from the male name Sylfa and -rød, meaning clearing (rydning). Søllerød Church was built on the top of Søllerød Hill in about 1175, showing that a village was already present at the site at that time. The extensive parish reached all the way from Furesø Lake in the west to the Øresund coast in the east. Søllerød Inn was opened by the pastor of Søllerød Church after he had obtained a license from the king in 1677.

Due to its proximity to Copenhagen, Søllerød, together with other localities in the area, became a popular location for well-to-do citizens from Copenhagen to acquire a country estate. The four largest properties in the village were Søllerødgård, Fogedgården, Carlsminde and Mothsgården.

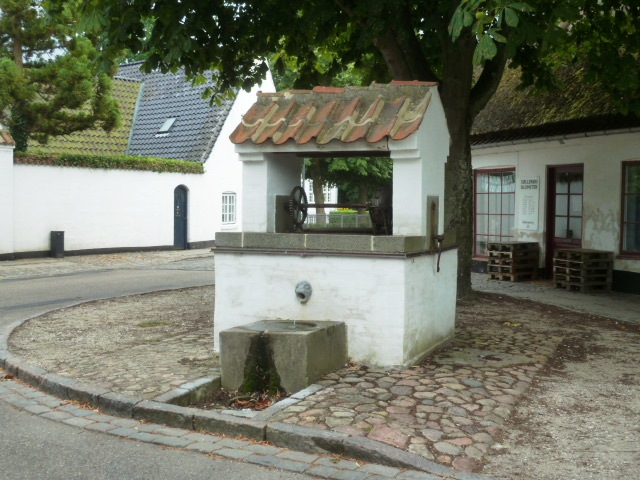
The old well next to the village pond. The current brick structure is from 1919

The villagers originally got their water supply from Søllerød Lake or for superior quality from Suhm's Spring in Øverød. Søllerødgaard had its own well from 1740 and a well was dug at the rectory in 1848, catering also to the school, which was located between the church and the rectory. In 1867, the owners of Søllerødgaard, Fogedgården, Carlsminde and Mothsgården constructed a new public water well next to the village pond.

Søllerød's first waterworks opened on Fogedgårdens's land to the east of the village in 1907. The village gradually developed into a suburban area and grew together with Nærum to the east. Vangebo School opened in 1958 to a design by Henning Larsen. Søllerød Municipality existed until 2007 when it was merged with Birkerød Municipality to form Rudersdal Municipality.

== Landmarks ==
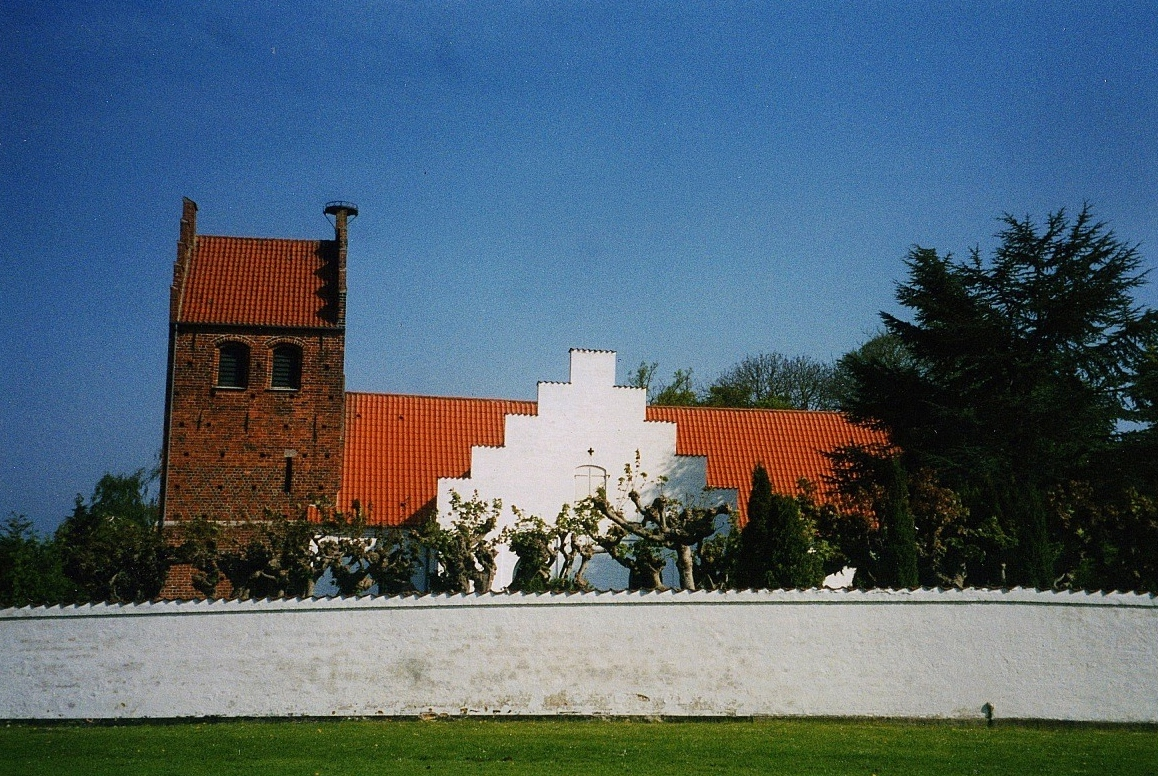
Søllerød Church

Søllerød Church stands on the top of Søllerød Hill. The Medieval church was a small flat-roofed structure built in chalk ashlar from Stevns Klint. It was later expanded with a chancel to the east and a porch to the north. The tower was built in 1450. The church was expanded with two cross arms in the 18th century. The smaller one, attached to the porch, is known as Københavnerlogen, a name that dates from the time when the church was often frequented by visitors from Copenhagen on Sundays.

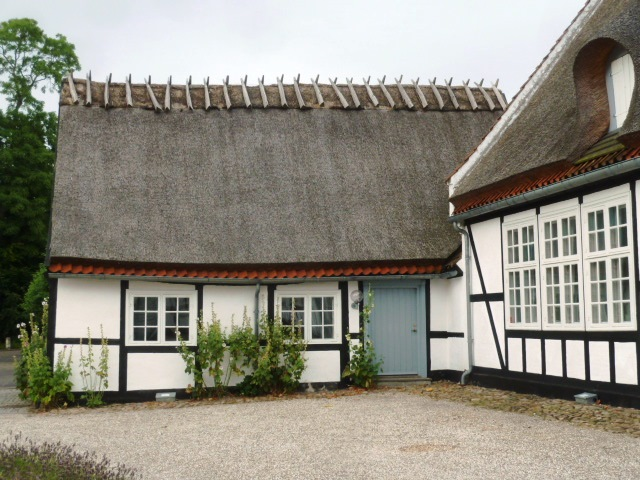
Søllerød Rectory

Søllerød Rectory is located next to the church. The thatched, half-timbered complex consists of a main wing, barns and stables. Søllerød Sognegård was designed by Inger and Johannes Exner and completed in 1993.

Søllerød Inn, one of the best restaurants in Denmark, was established in the 1980s. It has maintained a star in the Michelin Gude since 2001.

Mothsgården was from the 1680s until 1711 owned by Mathias Moth, who was Minister of Interior Affairs and the brother of Christian V's official mistress. The building now houses a local history museum operated by Rudersdal Municipality.

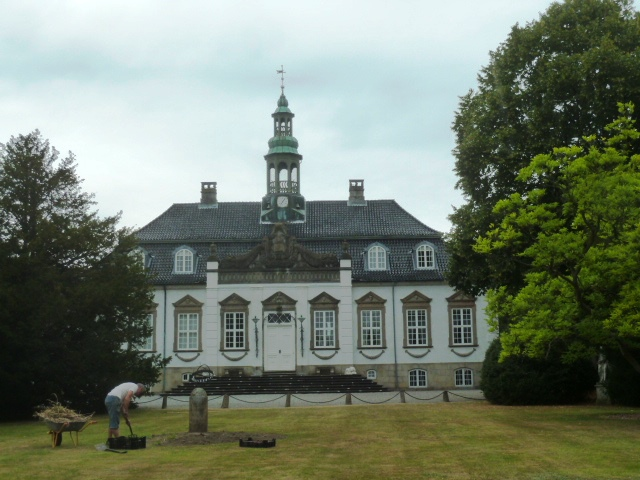
Søllerød Manor.

Another house with royal associations is Søllerødgaard, now known as Søllerød Slot. It was originally built by Frederik Danneskiold-Samsøe, a grandson of Christian V, between 1740 and 1743. Over the following decades, the property changed hands several times. Later residents included Frederick, Hereditary Prince of Denmark. The original house was replaced by a more modest one in 1784. The current house is from 1915. The property features a section of the original rough iron fence from the Odd Fellows Mansion in Bredgade, Copenhagen, which was dismantled when the house was expanded and converted into a concert venue in 1884.

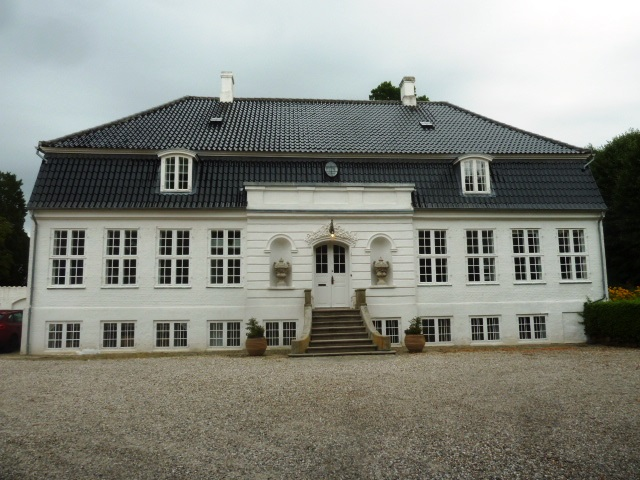
Carlsminde

Carlsminde (Søllerødvej 30) is a Rococo-style mansion from 1751. It now houses the headquarters of the Venstre Party. The building was listed in 1918. Fogedgården (Søllerødvej 38) and Ilufshøj (Søllerødvej 40) are also listed.

== Notable people ==
- The Piano Concerto in A minor, Op. 16 was composed by Edvard Grieg in Søllerød in 1868
- Oluf Hartmann (1879–1819), a Danish painter
- Muggur (1891 – 1924 in Søllerød) an Icelandic painter, graphic artist, author and film actor
- Kirsten Walther (1933 – 1987 in Søllerød), actress
- Peter Thorup (1948–2007), a Danish guitarist, singer, composer and record producer

=== Sport ===
- Otto Larsen (1893–1969) a Danish amateur football player
- Henning Petersen (born 1939) a former Danish cyclist, competed at the 1964 Summer Olympics
- Jacob Larsen (born 1988) a Danish rower, team silver medallist at the 2016 Summer Olympics
- Anne-Marie Rindom (born 1991), sailor, 2020 olympic champion

== Literature ==
- Stilling, Niels Peter: Søllerød Kirke. Søllerød Menighedsråd og Rudersdal Museer. 2011
