= Søllerød Naturpark =

Protected area in Denmark

Coordinates: 55.827°N 12.503°E

Søllerød Naturpark is a protected area of rolling fields, meadows and small woods in Rudersdal Municipality, some 20 kilometres north of central Copenhagen, Denmark. It reaches from Søllerød Kirkeskov in the south to Høje Sandbjerg in the north. The area is state-owned and managed by the Danish Nature Agency.

== Description ==
Rygård Overdrev ("Rygård Meadows") takes its name after the farm Rygård which is situated in the middle of the park. The oldest of its buildings date from the 1790s. It was restored and adapted by the architect Palle Suenson who owned the estate between 1940 and 1987. The cultivated parts of Søllerød Naturpark are used for the growing of winter feed for the deer population in Jægersborg Dyrehave. The area is farmed organically and the main crop is oat.

Søllerød Kirkeskov ("Søllerød Church Forest") is located in the southern part of the park, between the villages of Øverød and Søllerød. It once belonged to Søllerød Church and covers an area of 47 hectares. Attemosevej follows a watershed, meaning that water in Kalvemosen runs west to Indre Sø before continuing to Søllerød Lake, while water on the east side of the road is collected in Kikhanerenden and continues to the Øresund. A second wooded area, the small Rygaard Fredskov, is situated a little further to the north.

Høje Sandbjerg is located just north of the nature park. It reaches a height of 85 metres, making it the second highest point in Rudersdal Municipality. A viewpoint at the top affords sweeping views of the area and the Øresund with the island of Hven to the east.

== Access ==
There is access from Øverødvej, Gl. Holtevej, Høje Sandbjergvej and Rude Skov. A public parking lot is available on Gl. Holtevej, south of Høje Sandbjergvej .
