= Flemming Lassen =

Danish architect and designer (1902–1984)

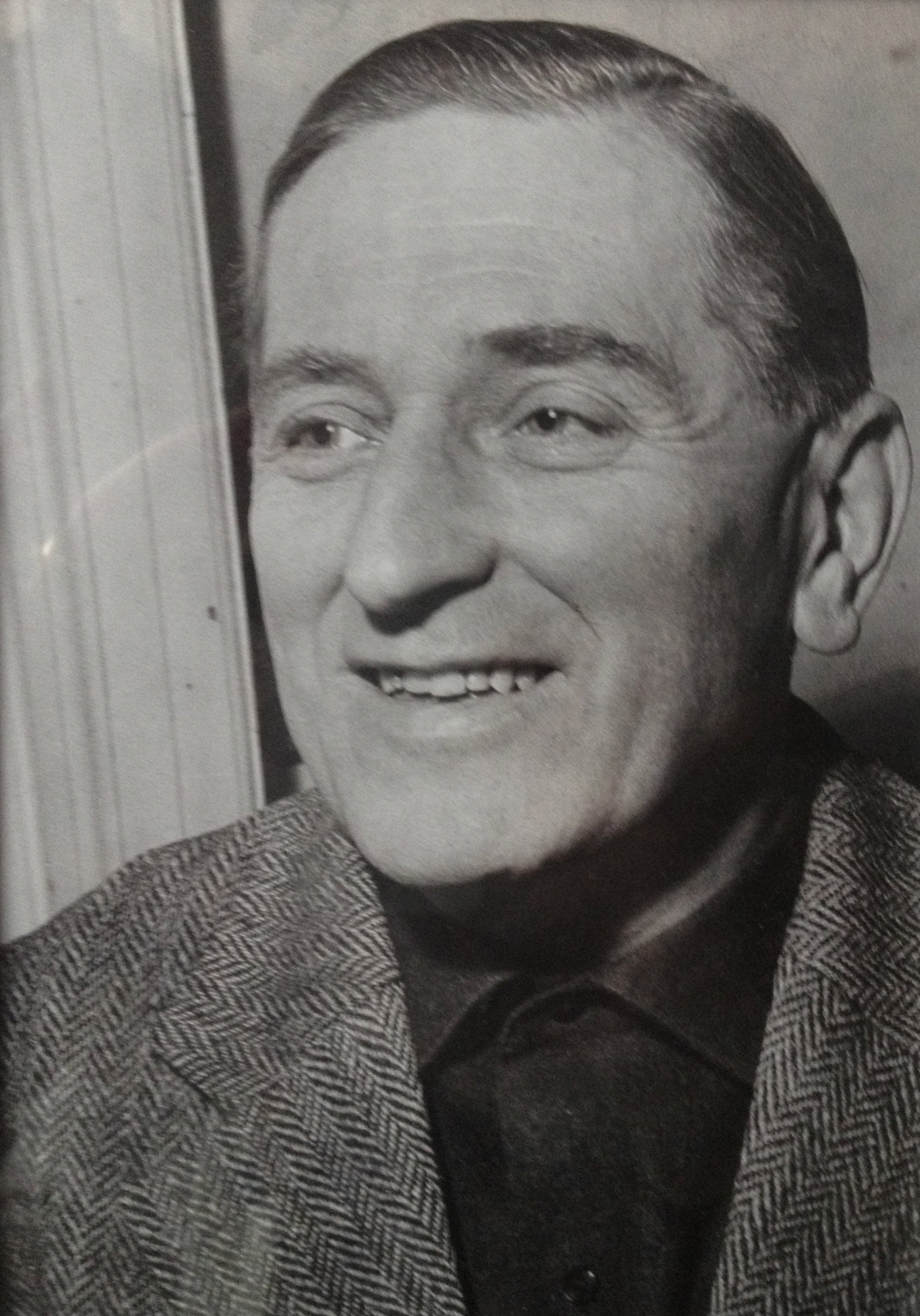
Flemming Lassen

Flemming Lassen (23 February 1902 – 18 February 1984) was a Modernist Danish architect and designer, working within the idiom of the International Style. Among his most notable buildings are libraries and cultural centres. He was the brother of Mogens Lassen, also an architect.

== Early life ==
Flemming Lassen was born on 23 February 1902 in Copenhagen into an artistic family. His father Hans Vilhelm Lassen was a decorative painter and his mother, Ingeborg Winding, was a painter. He trained as a mason before completing his education at the Technical School. After working in a number of different architecture studios, in the 1930s Lassen set up office with Arne Jacobsen with whom in 1929 he had won a Danish Architects Association competition for designing the "House of the Future". Built full scale at the subsequent exhibition in Copenhagen's Forum, it was a spiral-shaped, flat-roofed house in glass and concrete, incorporating a private garage, a boathouse and a helicopter pad. Other striking features were windows that rolled down like car windows, a conveyor tube for the mail and a kitchen stocked with ready-made meals.

== Architecture ==
Together with Jacobsen, he went on to design Søllerød Town Hall, completed in 1942 in a classical modernistic style inspired by Gunnar Asplund's extension of the city hall in Gothenburg. In partnership with Erik Møller, he designed the Nyborg Library (1940), for which he was awarded the Eckersberg Medal.

In the 1960s, Lassen completed a number of cultural centres and libraries including the Randers Cultural Centre, complete with a museum, a library and meeting rooms, in 1969. The three-storey rectangular building in reinforced concrete is illuminated from a central courtyard while the walls along the streets are free of windows. In the 1970s, together with his son Per Lassen, he designed a number of libraries including the public library in Lund, Sweden, the central library in Herning, the library and community centre in Hvidovre and the municipal library in Hobro. All display strongly Cubist lines with rather raw exteriors but with well formed, welcoming rooms.

== Furniture ==
In the 1930s and early 1940s, with his unconventional curved designs, Lassen contributed to the development of the Danish modern style. Always intent on simple, clearly defined lines, he also designed lamps and silverware.

== List of works ==
=== Buildings ===
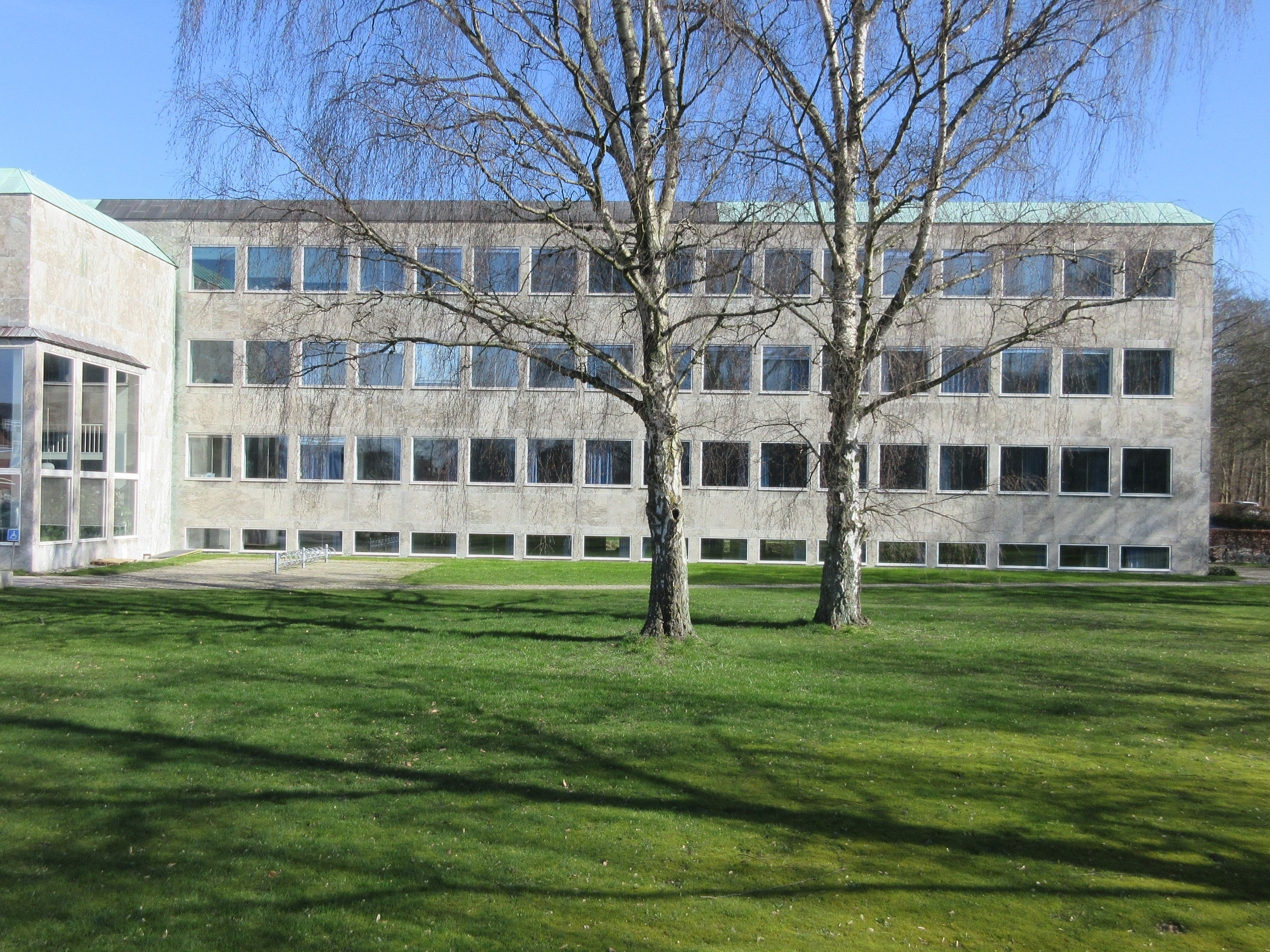
Rudersdal Town Hall

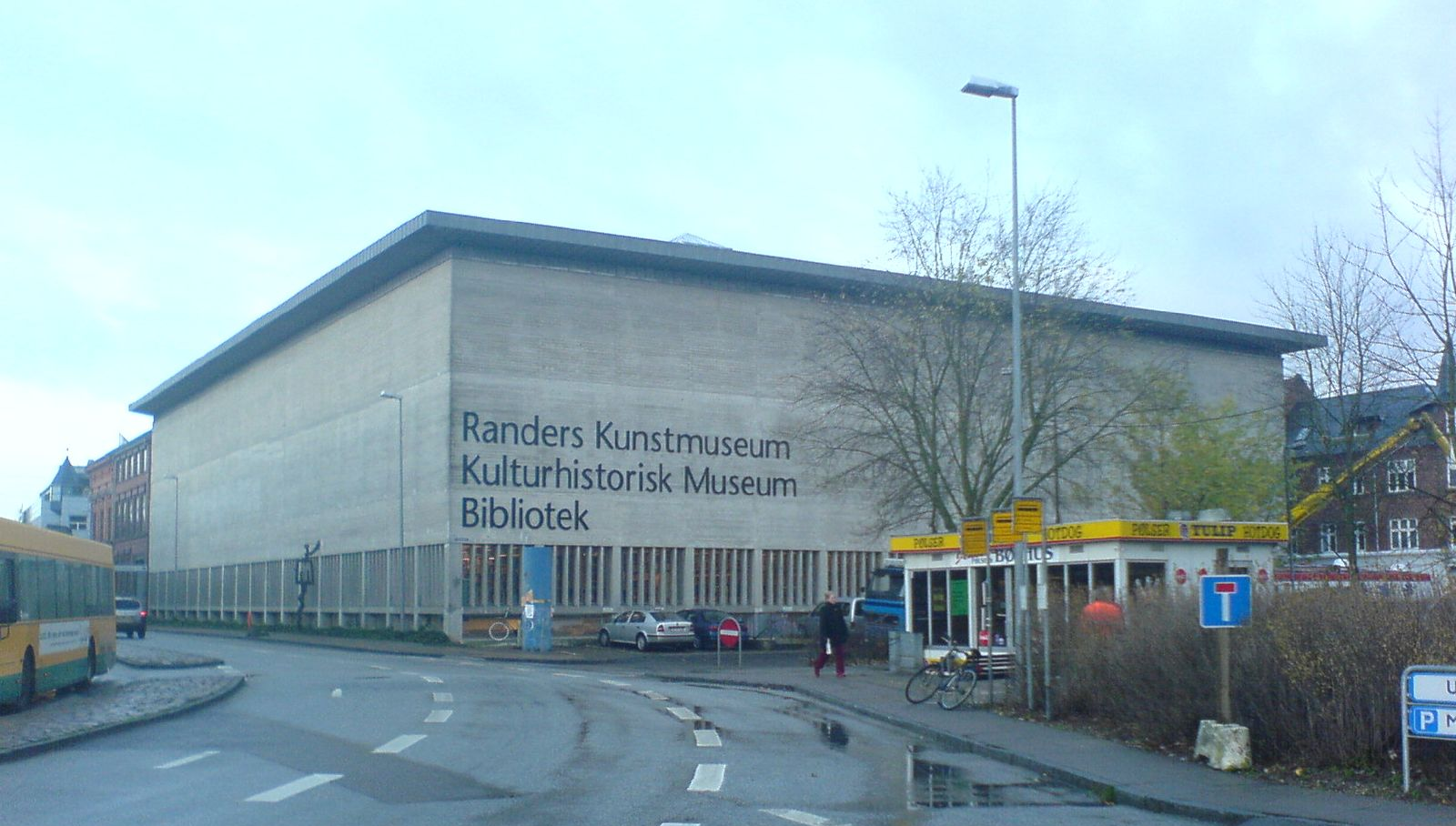
Randers Cultural Centre (1969)

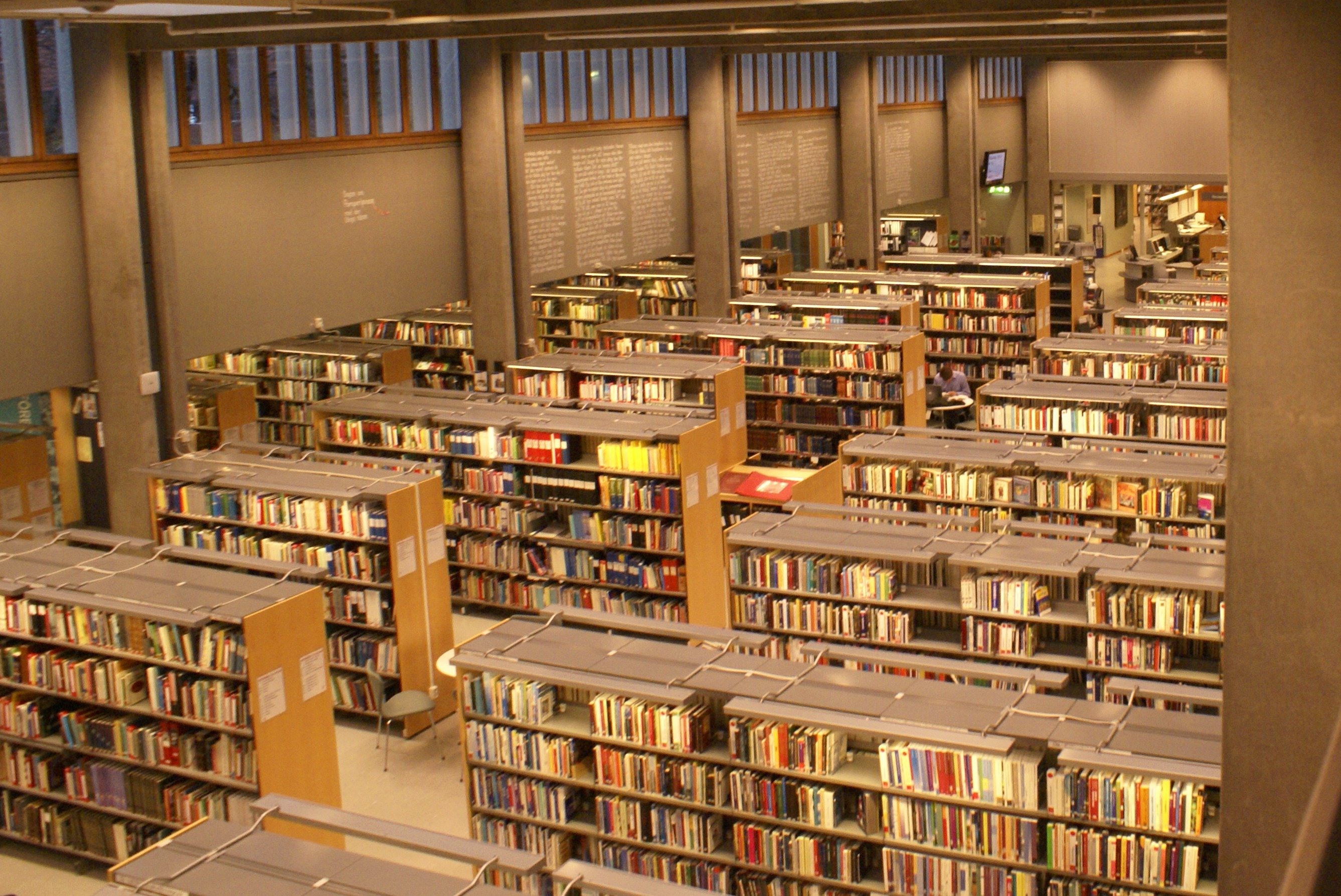
Lund Public Library

- Fremtidens Hus i Forum (1929, with Arne Jacobsen)
- Interior of photo shop, Vimmelskaftet 38, Copenhagen (1934, with Sophus Hvilsom)
- Enfamiliehus, Grøndalsvej 25, Frederiksberg (1938)
- Nyborg Public Library, Nyborg (1938-40, 1st prize 1938, with Erik Møller)
- Toftøjevej 9, Vanløse (1939)
- Søbredden 14, Gentofte (1940)
- Summer house in Rungsted (1940)
- 18 single-family detached homes, Brøndbyøstervej, Glostrup (1941, with Mogens Lassen)
- Søllerød Town Hall, Søllerød (1942, 1st prize 1939, with Arne Jacobsen)
- Bombebøssen, Dronningensgade 69, Copenhagen (1956)
- Parkskolen, Ballerup (1959, with Kjeld Bentsen and Ejner Graae)
- Jægersborg Public Library, Jægersborgvej (1963)
- Kulturhuset, Randers (1969)

Drom 1970_ With Per Lassen

- Stadsbiblioteket, Lund (1970)
- Herning Central Library, Herning (1970)
- Hvidovre Central Library and Cultural Centre, Hvidovre (1972-73)
- Hobro Public Library, Hobro (1978)

=== Furniture ===
- My Own Chair (1929)
- The Tired Man, lounge chair (1935)
- Wilhelm sofa (1935)
- Mayor sofa (1939, with Arne Jacobsen)
