= Rudersdal Municipality =

Rudersdal Municipality Rudersdal Kommune (Danish)
- Municipality
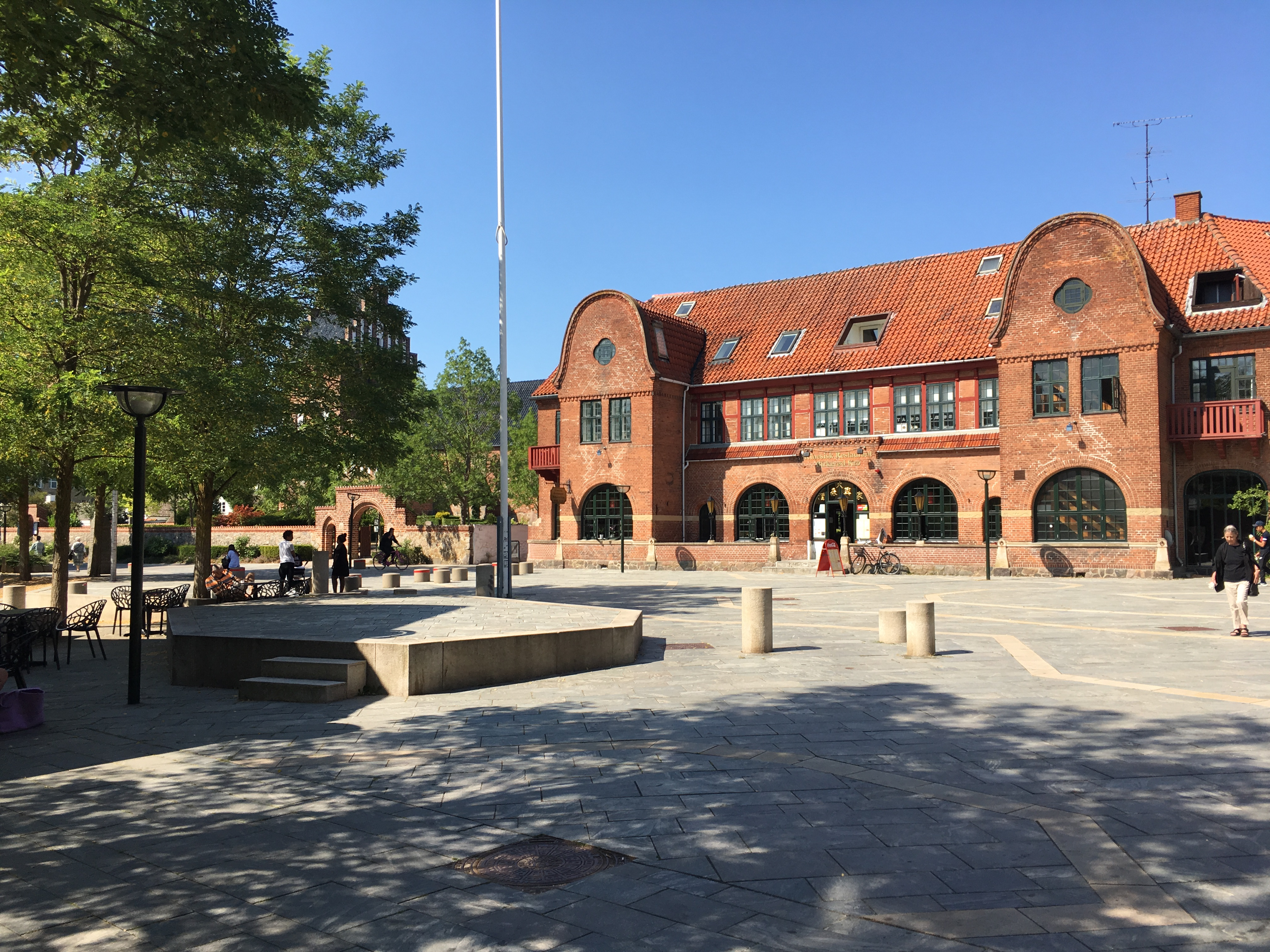

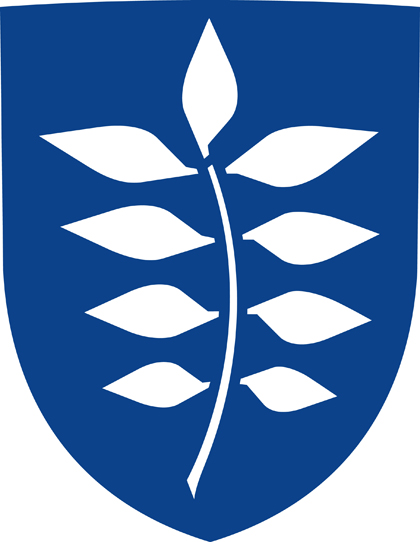
- Coat of arms

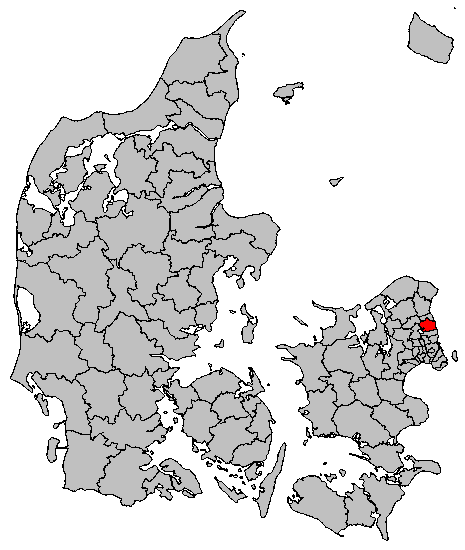
- Coordinates: 55°49′30″N 12°29′30″E
- Country: Denmark
- Region: Hovedstaden
- Established: 1 January 2007
- Seat: Holte

Government
  - Mayor: Ann Sofie Orth (C)

Area
  - Total: 73.34 km^{2} (28.32 sq mi)

Population (1 January 2026)
  - Total: 57,912
  - Density: 789.6/km^{2} (2,045/sq mi)
- Time zone: UTC+1 (CET)
  - Summer (DST): UTC+2 (CEST)
- Municipal code: 230
- Website: www.rudersdal.dk

Rudersdal Municipality (Danish: Rudersdal Kommune) is a part suburban, part rural municipality (Danish, kommune) located on the northern outskirts of Copenhagen, Denmark. It covers an area of 73 km^{2} and has a population of 57,912 (1 January 2026). The distance from Copenhagen City Hall Square is approximately 20 km. The western part of the municipality is served by the Hillerød radial of the S-train network while the eastern part is served by the Coast Line. Administratively Rudersdal Municipality belongs to Region Hovedstaden.

On 1 January 2007 Rudersdal municipality was created as the result of 2007 Danish Municipal Reform, consisting of the former municipalities of Søllerød and Birkerød.

Its mayor as of 2022 is Ann Sofie Orth. She is a member of the Conservative Party political party. Rudersdal Town Hall (formerly Søllerød Town Hall), completed in 1942, was designed by Arne Jacobsen and Flemming Lassen.

== History ==
Birkerød Municipality was a municipality in Frederiksborg County, and Søllerød Municipality was a municipality in Copenhagen County, both on the island of Zealand (Sjælland) in eastern Denmark. As of 2007 the two municipalities ceased to exist as they were merged to form Rudersdal Municipality. The municipality of Birkerød covered an area of 34 square kilometres (13 square miles), and had a total population of 21,930 (2005). It merged with Søllerød Municipality to form the new Rudersdal municipality. This created a municipality with an area of 73 square kilometres (28 square miles) and a total population of 53,621 (2005). The new municipality belongs to the new Region Hovedstaden ("Capital Region").

== Demography ==
As of 1 January 2015, 19,681 residents lived in neighbourhoods such as Holte and Søllerød that are part of Copenhagen's urban area, 20,191 lived in Birkerød, 12,491 lived in Hørsholm, 1,222 residents lived in Skodsborg, 606 residents lived in Ravnsnæs, 326 residents lived in Høsterkøb and 810 residents lived in rural zones.

=== Locations ===
Birkerød	20,191
Holte	14,765
Trørød	12,443
Nærum	5,230
Vedbæk	3,000
Skodsborg	1,253
Ravnsnæs	583
Høsterkøb	323
& Søllerød	
& Øverød	

== Transport ==
=== Rail ===
Birkerød and Holte stations are located on the Hillerød radial of the S-train network. Both are served by the A trains and Holte station is also served by the E trains.

Skodsborg and Vedbæk stations are located on the Coast Line between Copenhagen and Helsingør. The line is served by the Øresundståg trains.

The Nærum Line links Nærum with Jægersborg station on the S-train network.

=== Roads ===
Major roads include Lyngby Kongevej and the Helsingør Motorway.

=== Cycling and walking ===
KulturSlangen is a 14.5 km, signposted greenway which runs from Næsseslottet in Holte in the west to Vedbæk Marina on the Øresund Coast in the east. It was established in 1996 and passes various points of interest. A number of smaller round trails extends from the route. The Vedbæk Circuit (Danish: Vedbækturen) was inaugurated on 22 November 2015.

Rudersdal Municipality will be served by the under development network of Super Bikeways in metropolitan Copenhagen. Bike lanes are already available on Lyngby Kongevej and many other roads.

== Politics ==
=== Municipal council ===
Rudersdal's municipal council consists of 23 members, elected every four years.

Below are the municipal councils elected since the Municipal Reform of 2007.

Election	Party										Total seats	Turnout	Elected mayor
Election	A	B	C	F	I	L	O	R	V	Ø	Total seats	Turnout	Elected mayor
2005	3	2	2	1		4		1	14		27	76.1%	Erik Fabrin (V)
2009	3	1	4	2		4			9		23	71.1%	Erik Fabrin (V)
2013	3	1	3		1	4	1		9	1	23	75.8%	Jens Ive (V)
2017	4	2	4		1	3			8	1	23	75.0%	Jens Ive (V)
Data from Kmdvalg.dk 2005, 2009, 2013 and 2017

== Twin towns – sister cities ==
Rudersdal is twinned with four cities:

Asker, Norway; Eslöv, Sweden	Garðabær, Iceland; Jakobstad, Finland
