= Conrad Fabritius de Tengnagel =

Danish merchant, shipowner and patron of the arts

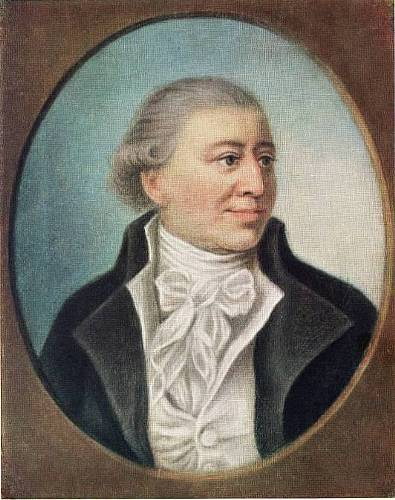
- Miniature portrait by Cornelius Høyer
- Born: 8 August 1731; Copenhagen, Denmark
- Died: 13 September 1805 (aged 74); Copenhagen, Denmark
- Occupations: Businessman and shipowner

Conrad Alexander Fabritius (8 August 1731 - 13 September 1805), ennobled by letters patent under the name Fabritius de Tengnagel in 1778, was a Danish merchant, shipowner and patron of the arts. He owned Enrum at Vedbæk from 1776.

== Early life and education ==
Conrad Fabritius was born on 8 August 1731 in Copenhagen, the son of Michael Fabritius (1697–1746) and Anna Maria Köster (1705–1775). His father was a co-founder of Fabritius & Wewer, a leading trading house in Copenhagen, but died when Conrad Fabritius was 15 years old. His mother was later married to her late husband's business partner, Johan Friederich Wewer, who continued Fabritius & Wewer. Conrad Fabritius and his brother Michael Fabritius were both educated in the company.

== Career ==
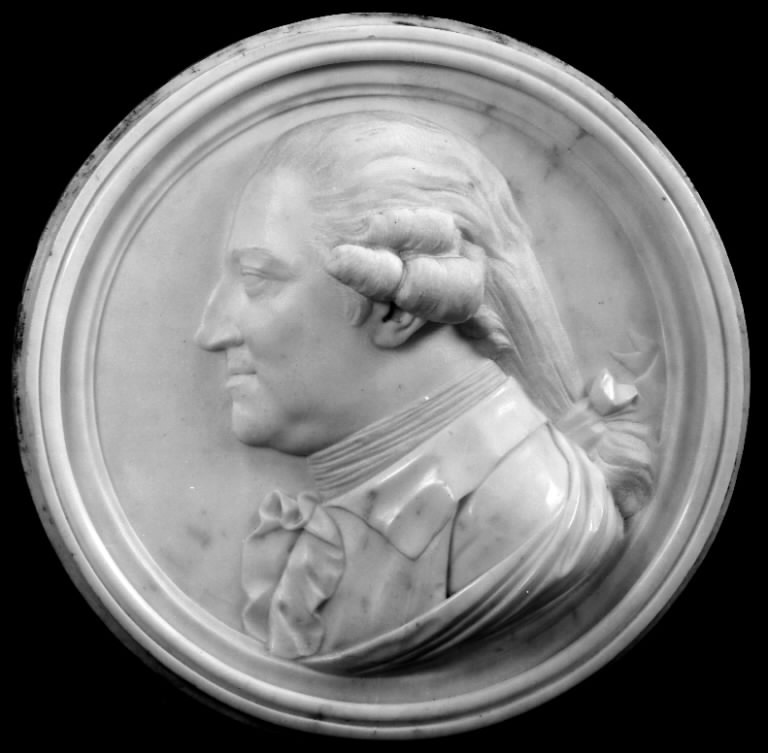
Portrait relief by Luigi di Giuseppe Grossi, 1780s

Conrad and Michael Fabritius continued Fabritius & Wewer after Wewer 's death.

In 1772, Fabritius de Tengnagel was elected as one of the directors of the Danish Asia Company. The company had just lost its monopoly on trade on the far east and he also traded on India with his own fleet of merchant ships. He resigned from his position as director of the Danish Asia Company in 1776 after his double role had resulted in criticism from the other participants in the enterprise but was again elected as director in 1778. Conrad and Michael Fabritius were on 4 May that same year ennobled by letters patent under the name Fabritius de Tengnagel.

In 1784, he was again forced to resign in connection with a scandal where a group of high-ranking employees had embezzled the company for close to DKK 500,000. The other shareholders in the company were outraged and wanted the directors to be held accountable. In the end Fabritius de Tengnagel had to pay 10,000 Danish rigsdaler in compensation to the company.

== Personal life ==
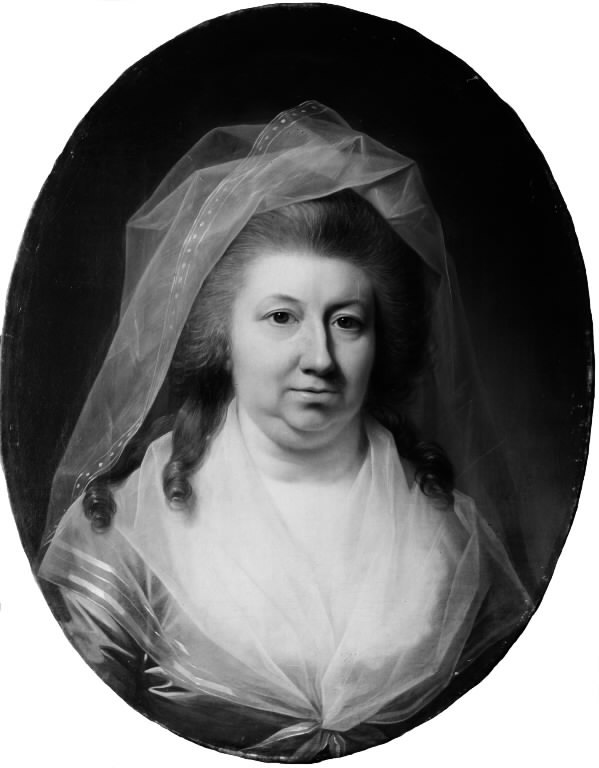
Debora Fabritius de Tengnagel painted by Jens Juel

Fabritius de Tengnagel married Debora Kloppenburg (29 June 1739 - 2 November 1814), a daughter of Peter Kloppenburg and Johanne Marie van Laban-Ehelieden, on 27 April 1758 in Vreeland. They had two sons, Michael Peter Fabritius de Tengnagel (1 March 1759 – 1810) and Carl Frederik Fabritius de Tengnagel (11 April 1762 – 7 February 1824).

The family lived at Holmens Kanal 2–4 in 1770 – 1772, then at Amaliegade 2 in 1773 – 1775 and finally at Slotsholmsgade 12 in 1776 – 1805. All three buildings have later been demolished. In 1775, Fabritius de Tengnagel inherited the country house Enrum at Vedbæk. He undertook a comprehensive renovation of the house and created a number of monuments and other features in the garden, including columns, artificial ponds and a miniature fortification with cannons that saluted at festive occasions.

He died on 13 September 1805 in Copenhagen and is buried at the Cemetery of Holmen.
