= 2025 Rudersdal municipal election =

Municipal election in Denmark

← 2021	18 November 2025	2029 →

All 23 seats to the Rudersdal municipal council 12 seats needed for a majority
- Turnout: 33,319 (75.6%) ▲1.6%
	First party	Second party	Third party
	C	V	B
Party	Conservatives	Venstre	Social Liberals
Last election	9 seats, 33.1%	5 seats, 22.9%	2 seats, 7.7%
Seats won	7	5	4
Seat change	▼2	0	▲2
Popular vote	9,175	6,557	4,008
Percentage	27.8%	19.9%	12.2%
Swing	▼5.3%	▼3.0%	▲4.4%
	Fourth party	Fifth party	Sixth party
	I	A	Ø
Party	Liberal Alliance	Social Democrats	Red-Green Alliance
Last election	0 seats, 2.8%	3 seats, 10.9%	1 seat, 5.2%
Seats won	3	1	1
Seat change	▲3	▼2	0
Popular vote	3,351	2,219	2,204
Percentage	10.2%	6.7%	6.7%
Swing	▲7.4%	▼4.1%	▲1.4%
	Seventh party	Eighth party
	F	L
Party	Green Left	Lokallisten
Last election	1 seat, 4.4%	2 seats, 9.1%
Seats won	1	1
Seat change	0	▼1
Popular vote	1,885	1,692
Percentage	5.7%	5.1%
Swing	▲1.3%	▼4.0%
Mayor before election
Ann Sofie Orth
Conservatives
Mayor after election
Anne Sofie Orth
Conservatives

The 2025 Rudersdal Municipal election was held on November 18, 2025, to elect the 23 members to sit in the regional council for the Rudersdal Municipal council, in the period of 2026 to 2029. Anne Sofie Orth from the Conservatives, would win the mayoral position.

== Background ==
Following the 2021 election, Ann Sofie Orth from Conservatives became mayor for her first term, becoming the first mayor not from Venstre in the municipality. She would to run for a second term,

== Electoral system ==
For elections to Danish municipalities, a number varying from 9 to 31 are chosen to be elected to the municipal council. The seats are then allocated using the D'Hondt method and a closed list proportional representation. Rudersdal Municipality had 23 seats in 2025.

== Electoral alliances ==
=== Electoral Alliance 1 ===
Party		Political alignment
B	Social Liberals	Centre to Centre-left
F	Green Left	Centre-left to Left-wing
L	Lokallisten	Local politics

=== Electoral Alliance 2 ===
Party		Political alignment
C	Conservatives	Centre-right
M	Moderates	Centre to Centre-right

=== Electoral Alliance 3 ===
Party		Political alignment
I	Liberal Alliance	Centre-right to Right-wing
O	Danish People's Party	Right-wing to Far-right

=== Electoral Alliance 4 ===
Party		Political alignment
Ø	Red-Green Alliance	Left-wing to Far-Left
Å	The Alternative	Centre-left to Left-wing

== Results by polling station ==
Division	A	B	C	F	I	L	M	O	V	Ø	Å
Division	%	%	%	%	%	%	%	%	%	%	%
Birkerød	9.2	14.5	22.8	7.3	5.9	11.3	2.8	2.9	13.7	8.7	0.9
Grünersvej	5.0	11.5	32.7	4.7	11.9	2.3	2.2	2.2	22.2	4.8	0.5
Nærum	11.1	9.4	33.7	6.9	7.5	1.9	1.6	4.7	14.4	8.1	0.7
Sjælsø	6.5	14.4	25.7	6.1	9.4	8.4	2.4	2.9	14.8	8.6	0.7
Skovly	5.3	12.8	34.8	4.8	11.9	2.5	1.3	2.2	17.8	5.5	1.2
Toftevang	6.4	15.9	23.1	7.5	7.0	11.2	2.8	3.3	12.8	9.0	0.9
Trørød	9.5	9.2	25.4	5.3	14.2	1.5	1.8	3.7	24.5	4.6	0.4
Vangebo	3.3	12.5	31.3	4.8	12.9	1.6	1.4	2.0	23.0	6.2	1.0
Vedbæk	4.5	8.4	27.3	3.6	12.7	1.1	1.6	2.4	34.1	4.0	0.3

== Results ==
Party		Votes	%	+/-	Seats	+/-
Rudersdal Municipality
C	Conservatives	9,175	27.82	-5.26	7	-2
V	Venstre	6,557	19.88	-3.04	5	0
B	Social Liberals	4,008	12.15	+4.42	4	+2
I	Liberal Alliance	3,351	10.16	+7.40	3	+3
A	Social Democrats	2,219	6.73	-4.13	1	-2
Ø	Red-Green Alliance	2,204	6.68	+1.44	1	0
F	Green Left	1,885	5.72	+1.32	1	0
L	Lokallisten	1,692	5.13	-3.96	1	-1
O	Danish People's Party	971	2.94	+1.97	0	0
M	Moderates	680	2.06	New	0	New
Å	The Alternative	234	0.71	New	0	New
Total		32,976	100	N/A	23	N/A
Invalid votes		86	0.20	-0.06		
Blank votes		257	0.58	+0.04		
Turnout		33,319	75.63	+1.55		
Source: valg.dk

== Opinion polls ==
Polling firm	Fieldwork date	Sample size	C	V	A	L	B	Ø	F	I	O	M	Å	Others	Lead
Epinion	4 Sep - 13 Oct 2025	506	21.4	25.5	8.1	–	7.7	6.3	8.5	12.1	3.8	1.0	1.6	3.9	4.1
2024 european parliament election	9 Jun 2024		15.1	18.5	9.2	–	11.5	4.2	14.2	11.4	3.4	8.7	2.0	–	3.4
2022 general election	1 Nov 2022		12.5	18.4	14.2	–	8.3	3.7	6.5	13.9	1.5	12.6	3.5	–	4.2
2021 regional election	16 Nov 2021		37.2	17.4	12.6	–	11.6	5.5	5.7	3.0	1.4	–	0.4	–	19.8
2021 municipal election	16 Nov 2021		33.1 (9)	22.9 (5)	10.9 (3)	9.1 (2)	7.7 (2)	5.2 (1)	4.4 (1)	2.8 (0)	1.0 (0)	–	–	–	10.2
