= Rydhave =

Listed building in Helsingør, Denmark

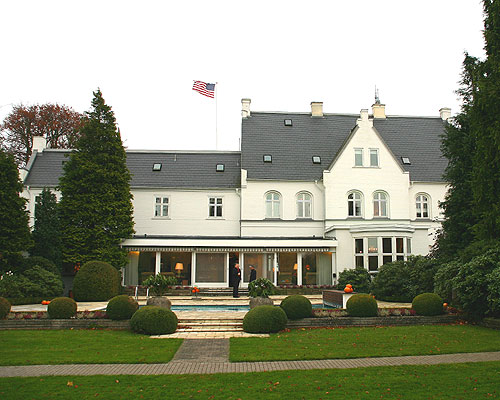
- Interactive map of the Rydhave area

General information
- Location: Charlottenlund, Gentofte Municipality, Strandvejen 259, Charlottenlund, Denmark
- Coordinates: 55°45′25.42″N 12°35′39.34″E
- Construction started: 1885

Design and construction
- Architect: Vilhelm Petersen

Rydhave (also known as Villa Rydhave) is the official residence of the American ambassador to Denmark. The villa is situated at Strandvejen 259, on the border between Charlottenlund and Skovshoved, Gentofte Municipality. The depity ambassador resides at nearby Villa Søro (Strandvejen 190).

== History ==
=== Early history ===
The house was built in 1885 for Emil Edvard Schnackenburg (1818–1894) and was designed by the architect Vilhelm Petersen. Emil Edvard was the son of Carl Gotlieb Schnackenburg and Henriette Elisabeth Schnackenburg. He grew up on the family's estate in Vejle, Brandbjerg, which was sold by his father in 1840. He had later married to Caroline Marie Bracht (1829–1908), whose father, Henning Johannes Peter von Bracht, owned Rydhave at Holstebro. Schnackenburg is later mentioned as the owner of a brickyard, most likely Rydhave Brikyard at his father-in-law's estate.

=== Carl Drost, 1900–1918 ===
Caroline Marie Schnackenburg sold Villa Rydhave to Carl Drost (1852–1926) in 1900. He had made a fortune in the coal trade. In 1903, together with two partners, he bought Sindshvile at Kvistgård. A brickyard had just been constructed on the estate. Drost headed the operations until 1905. Drost moved to Hørsholm in 1918. He is buried in a large mausoleum at Hørsholm Cemetery.

=== Hansen, 1918–1942 ===
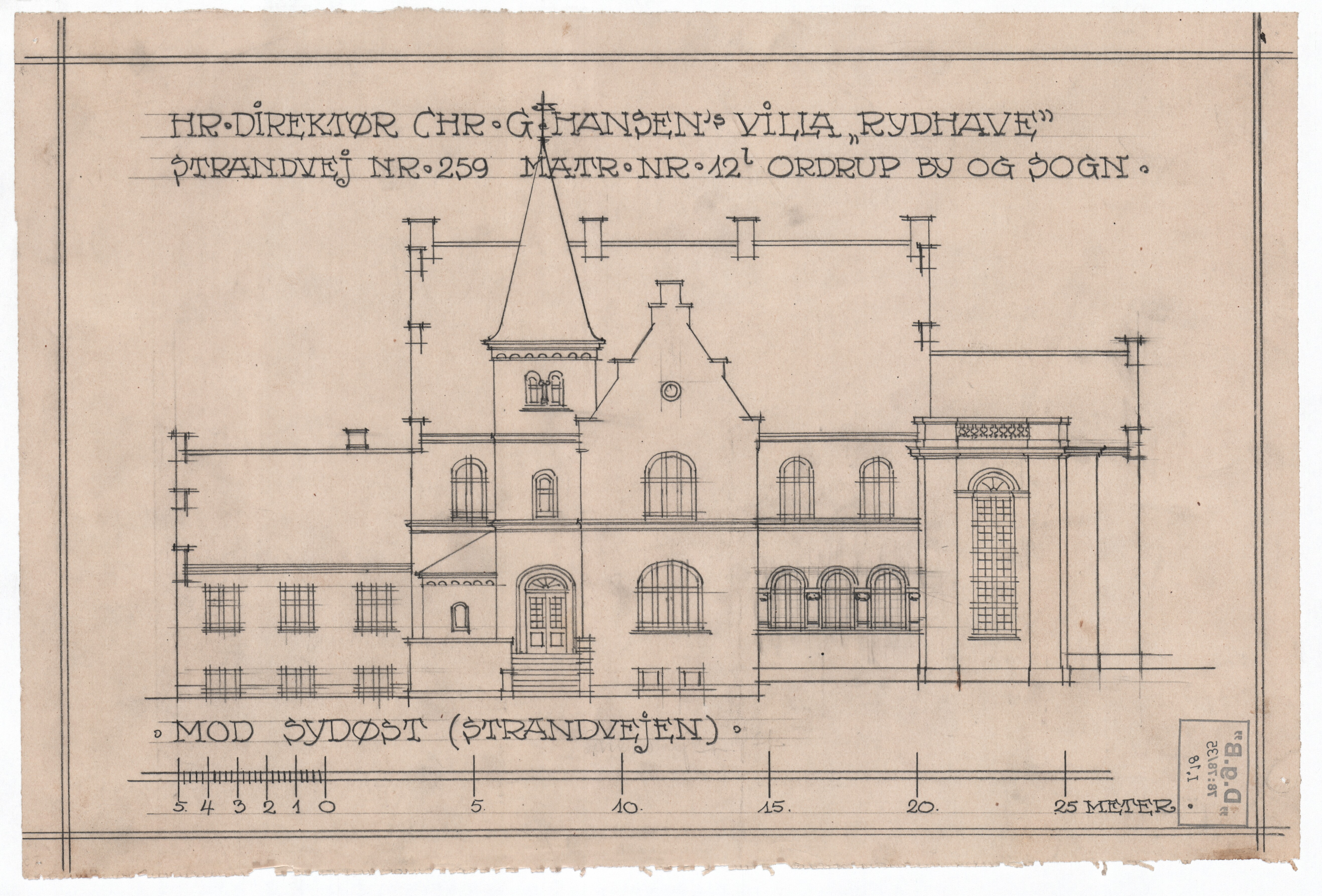
Design proposal for Axel Høeg-Hansen's 1918 expansion of the building.

In 1918, Drost sold Villa Rudhave to Christian G. Hansen (1863–1941). Hansen expanded the estate with a number of adjacent properties located to the north. The house was subsequently expanded with the assistance of the architect Axel Høeg-Hansen. The garden was redesigned by Birger Errboe.

Hansen was originally from Nordborg on Als. He served as chief executing officer of Korn- og Foderstofkompagniet from 1896 to 1933. He and the company's head office had moved to Copenhagen from Aarhus in 1915. He was married to Annetta Stephania Rozzi.

=== World War II ===
In 1942, Villa Rydhave was sold to Ejendomsselskabet af 8' Juni 1932. On 15 December, it was acquired by Das Auswärtige Amt as a new home for Werner Best.

=== Residence for the American ambassador ===
After the liberation in 1945, Villa Rydhave was confiscated by the Danish government. Best was placed under house arrest in the building. In 1946, it was acquired by the American government as the official residence of the American ambassador to Denmark.

In 2022, an extensive renovation of the house began. As a result of the ongoing renovation, Alan Leventhal resided in Villa Søro, a house from 1880 a little down the street (Strandvejen 190), which normally serves as residence for the deputy ambassador. Ken Howery resides at Strandridergaarden in Vedbæk.
