= 2021 Rudersdal municipal election =

| ← 2017 | 16 November 2021 | 2025 → |

All 23 seats to the Rudersdal Municipal Council 12 seats needed for a majority
- Turnout: 23,313 (74.1%) ▼0.8pp
| | First party | Second party | Third party |
|---|---|---|---|
| | C | V | A |
| Party | Conservatives | Venstre | Social Democrats |
| Last election | 4 seats, 16.8% | 8 seats, 30.6% | 4 seats, 13.5% |
| Seats won | 9 | 5 | 3 |
| Seat change | ▲5 | ▼3 | ▼1 |
| Popular vote | 10,574 | 7,328 | 3,470 |
| Percentage | 33.1% | 22.9% | 10.9% |
| Swing | ▲16.3% | ▼7.7% | ▼2.6% |
| | Fourth party | Fifth party | Sixth party |
| | L | B | Ø |
| Party | Lokalisten | Social Liberals | Red–Green Alliance |
| Last election | 3 seats, 11,6% | 2 seats, 7.9% | 1 seat, 3.4% |
| Seats won | 2 | 2 | 1 |
| Seat change | ▼1 | 0 | 0 |
| Popular vote | 2,905 | 2,472 | 1,676 |
| Percentage | 9.1% | 7.7% | 5.2% |
| Swing | ▼2.5% | ▼0.2% | ▲1.8% |
| | Seventh party | Eighth party |
| | F | I |
| Party | Green Left | Liberal Alliance |
| Last election | 0 seats, 2.5% | 1 seat, 5.4% |
| Seats won | 1 | 0 |
| Seat change | ▲1 | ▼1 |
| Popular vote | 1,404 | 883 |
| Percentage | 4.4% | 2.8% |
| Swing | ▲1.9% | ▼2.6% |
Mayor before election
Jens Ive
Venstre
Mayor after election
Ann Sofie Orth
Conservatives

Ever since the 2009 election resulted in Erik Fabrin from Venstre becoming mayor, Venstre had held the mayor's position in the Municipality. (Note: counting since 2007 where the municipality was altered) It was Jens Ive who had become mayor following the 2017 election

In this election, the Conservatives would surprisingly become the biggest party. They won 9 seats, an increase of 4, while Venstre won 5 seats, 3 less than in 2017. The Conservatives would eventually find an agreement with Lokalisten and Danish Social Liberal Party, which would see Ann Sofie Orth becoming the first mayor in the municipality from the Conservatives. (Note: counting since 2007 where the municipality was altered) Eventually, all parties would agree on the constitution.

== Electoral system ==
For elections to Danish municipalities, a number varying from 9 to 31 are chosen to be elected to the municipal council. The seats are then allocated using the D'Hondt method and a closed list proportional representation. Rudersdal Municipality had 23 seats in 2021

Unlike in Danish General Elections, in elections to municipal councils, electoral alliances are allowed.

== Electoral alliances ==
=== Electoral Alliance 1 ===
| Party | | Political alignment |
|---|---|---|
| A | Social Democrats | Centre-left |
| B | Social Liberals | Centre to Centre-left |
| L | Lokallisten | Local politics |

=== Electoral Alliance 2 ===
| Party | | Political alignment |
|---|---|---|
| C | Conservatives | Centre-right |
| D | New Right | Right-wing to Far-right |
| I | Liberal Alliance | Centre-right to Right-wing |
| O | Danish People's Party | Right-wing to Far-right |

=== Electoral Alliance 3 ===
| Party | | Political alignment |
|---|---|---|
| F | Green Left | Centre-left to Left-wing |
| Ø | Red–Green Alliance | Left-wing to Far-Left |

== Results by polling station ==
R = BorgerFokus

| Division | A | B | C | D | F | I | L | O | R | V | Ø |
| Division | % | % | % | % | % | % | % | % | % | % | % |
|---|---|---|---|---|---|---|---|---|---|---|---|
| Birkerød | 15.2 | 8.0 | 23.4 | 1.9 | 4.2 | 1.7 | 17.8 | 1.5 | 0.3 | 19.3 | 6.5 |
| Grünersvej | 8.3 | 6.4 | 44.9 | 2.1 | 4.3 | 3.0 | 4.1 | 0.7 | 0.1 | 21.7 | 4.4 |
| Nærum | 18.8 | 7.3 | 27.6 | 3.5 | 6.0 | 2.2 | 5.7 | 1.4 | 0.2 | 21.2 | 6.1 |
| Sjælsø | 10.2 | 9.1 | 28.0 | 2.5 | 4.7 | 2.7 | 15.5 | 1.0 | 0.3 | 19.8 | 6.2 |
| Vangebo | 6.0 | 7.3 | 41.6 | 2.2 | 4.2 | 3.6 | 3.5 | 0.7 | 0.3 | 26.2 | 4.5 |
| Trørød | 12.7 | 7.1 | 34.7 | 3.0 | 4.4 | 3.2 | 3.7 | 1.0 | 0.2 | 26.2 | 3.8 |
| Toftevang | 11.6 | 9.6 | 25.0 | 2.7 | 4.8 | 2.1 | 15.9 | 1.4 | 0.6 | 18.7 | 7.8 |
| Skovly | 8.9 | 8.5 | 41.5 | 2.8 | 4.2 | 4.0 | 5.2 | 0.3 | 0.1 | 20.6 | 4.1 |
| Vedbæk | 6.4 | 6.1 | 37.6 | 3.5 | 3.2 | 3.2 | 4.0 | 0.6 | 0.1 | 32.3 | 3.0 |

== Results ==
| Party | | Votes | % | +/- | Seats | +/- |
Rudersdal Municipality
| C | Conservatives | 10,574 | 33.09 | +16.23 | 9 | +5 |
| V | Venstre | 7,328 | 22.93 | -7.64 | 5 | -3 |
| A | Social Democrats | 3,470 | 10.86 | -2.64 | 3 | -1 |
| L | Lokallisten | 2,905 | 9.09 | -2.52 | 2 | -1 |
| B | Social Liberals | 2,472 | 7.73 | -0.14 | 2 | 0 |
| Ø | Red-Green Alliance | 1,676 | 5.24 | +1.84 | 1 | 0 |
| F | Green Left | 1,403 | 4.39 | +1.87 | 1 | +1 |
| I | Liberal Alliance | 883 | 2.76 | -2.62 | 0 | -1 |
| D | New Right | 856 | 2.68 | +0.26 | 0 | 0 |
| O | Danish People's Party | 313 | 0.98 | -2.08 | 0 | 0 |
| R | BorgerFokus | 79 | 0.25 | New | 0 | New |
| Total | | 31,959 | 100 | N/A | 23 | N/A |
| Invalid votes | | 112 | 0.26 | +0.05 | | |
| Blank votes | | 242 | 0.55 | -0.12 | | |
| Turnout | | 32,313 | 74.07 | -0.86 | | |
Source: valg.dk
