= Bakkehuset (Vedbæk) =

Building in Rudersdal Municipality, Denmark

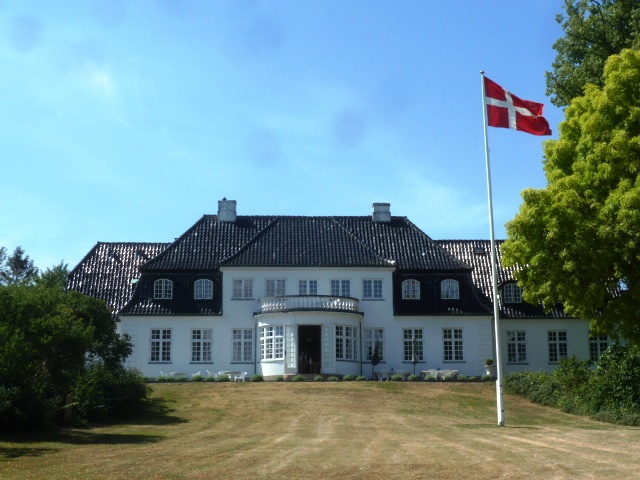
- Interactive map of the Bakkehuset area

General information
- Location: Vedbæk, Rudersdal Municipality, Vedbæk Strandvej 373, 2950 Vedbæk, Denmark
- Coordinates: 55°50′54.78″N 12°34′10.06″E
- Construction started: 1915

Design and construction
- Architect: Carl Brummer

Bakkehuset is a former country house in Vedbæk, Rudersdal Municipality, Denmark.

== History ==
=== Hvidt family, 1711–1915 ===
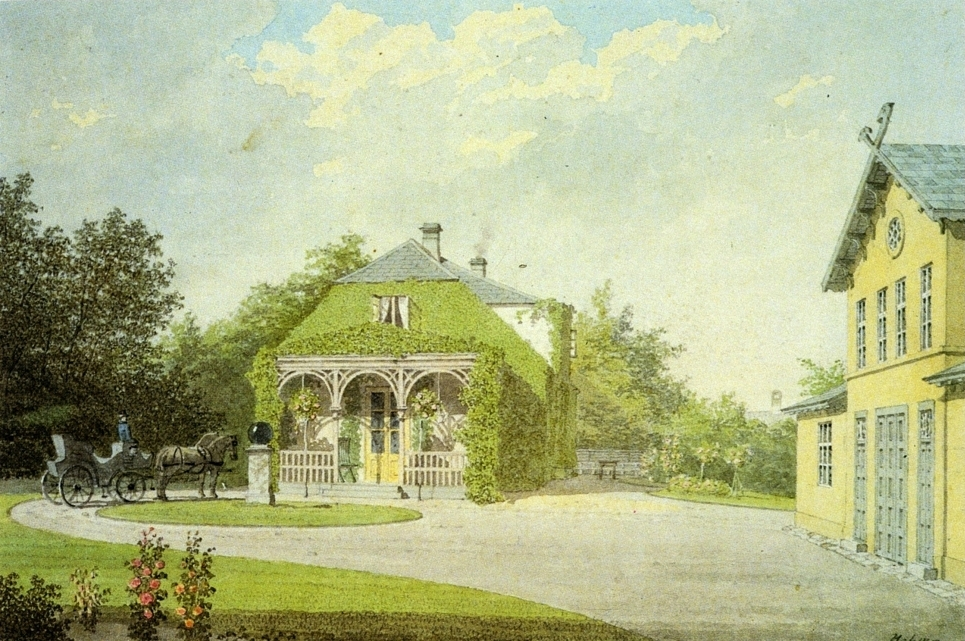
Bakkehuset

Bakkehuset was originally part of the Enrum estate. In 1811, Bakkehuset was acquired by Lauritz Nicolai Hvidt. Bakkehuset served as his summer residence for more than 50 years. He constructed a pier in front of the building. Denmark's first steam ship Calodonia stopped at the pier en route between Copenhagen and Helsingør. Bakkehuset was later owned by his son Edward Hvidt and grandson Lauritz Nicolai Hvidt Jr.

=== Levin and the new building, 1915–1922 ===
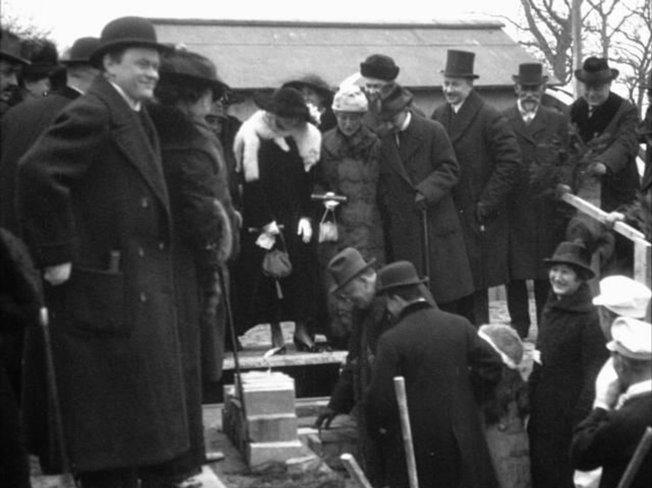
Levin sets the foundation stone in 1915.

On 16 October 1915, Bakkehuset was acquired by the broker Johan Levin. He replaced the old house with a new one designed by Carl Brummer. Levin went bankrupt as a result of the Alberti scandal.

=== Later history, 1922–present ===
Bakkehuset had five different owners between 1922 and 1980. The last of them was Viggo Troels-Smith, who served as CEO of IBM's Danish operations. In 1980, he sold Bakkehuset to Søllerød Municipality. The building was subsequently turned into an activity centre for senior citizens.
