= Frederik Michael Ernst Fabritius de Tengnagel =

Danish military officer and landscape painter

Frederik Michael Ernst Fabritius de Tengnagel (2 January 1781 – 27 May 1849) was a Danish military officer and landscape painter. As a painter, he specialized in winter landscapes.

== Early life ==
He was born at Vejlegård on Funen to the parents Michael Fabritius de Tengnagel and Adolphine née Leth. His father was a son of the wealthy Copenhagen-based merchant and shipowner Michael Fabritius and had been ennobled by letters patent under the name Fabritius de Tengnagel in 1778.

== Military career ==
Fabritius de Tengnagel initially followed his parents' wishes, enrolling in the Royal Danish Army. He was appointed Cornet at the Funen Dragoon Regiment. He was awarded the honorary title Krigsråd in 1823.

== Landscape painting ==
In 1813, Fabritius de Tengnagel resigned from the army to become an artist. He studied privately with Jens Peter Møller and exhibited his first works in 1820. In 1723 he went on a short journey to Germany where he visited Johan Christian Dahl with whom he had studied at Møller's art school.

Dahl remained a major influence on his work. He was the only Danish painter of his time that specialized in winter landscapes. He was very productive and sold well in his own day.

== Personal life ==
Fabritius de Tengnagel never married. He died on 27 May 1849 and is buried at Vejlev Cemetery.
