= Rydhave (manor house) =

Manor house near Holstebro, Denmark

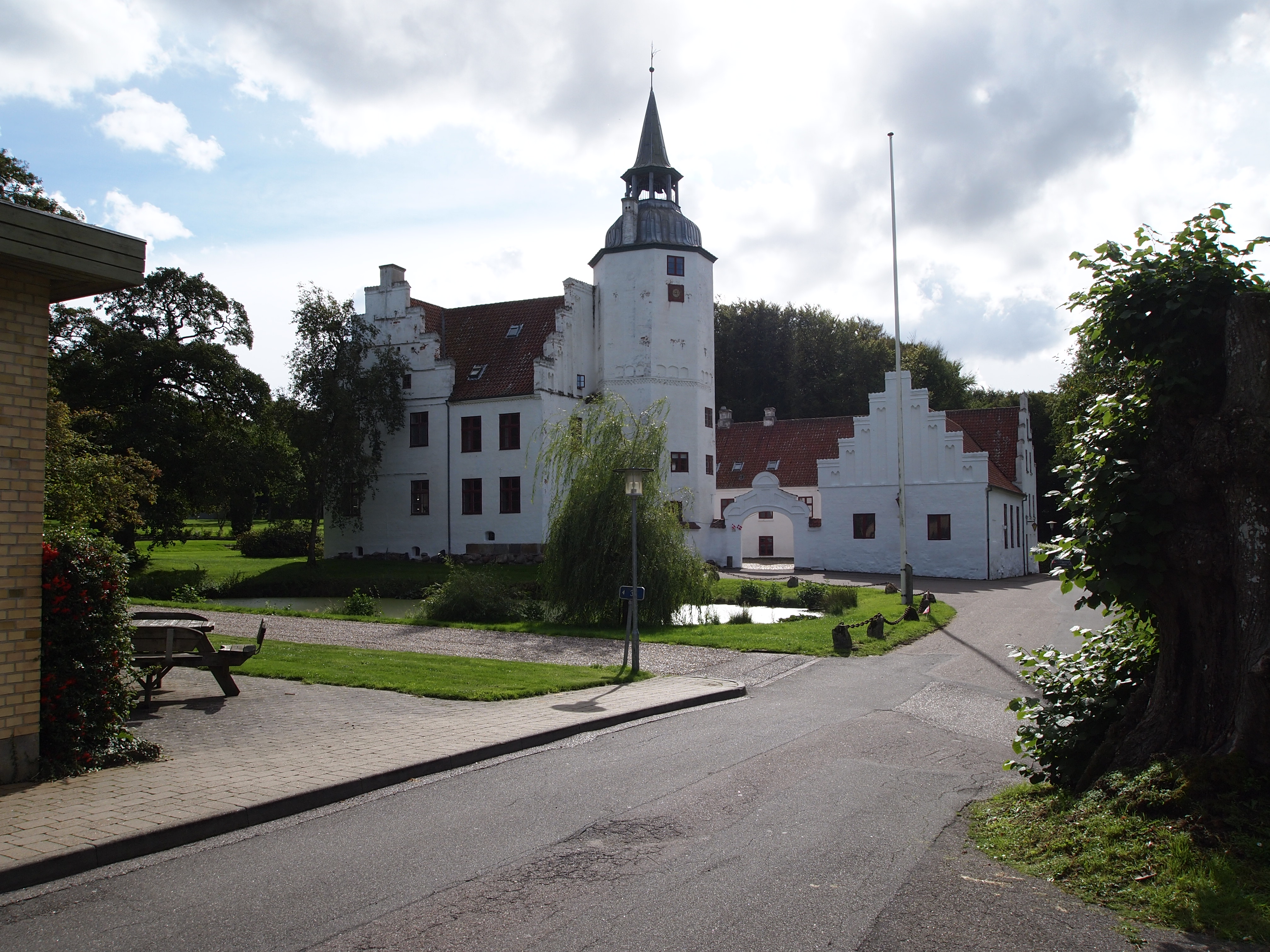
- Interactive map of the Rydhave area

General information
- Location: Struer Municipality, Holstebrovej 38, 7830 Vinderup, Denmark
- Coordinates: 56°27′10.64″N 8°45′40.51″E
- Completed: 16th century and later

Rydhave is a former manor house and estate situated close to Vinderup, on the main road between Holstebro and Skive, Holstebro Municipality, in northwestern Denmark. It belonged to members of the Sehested family for more than 200 years. It is now operated as a boarding school (Danish Efterskole). The 16th-century main building was listed on the Danish register of protected buildings and places in 1918. The country house Villa Rydhave in Charlottenlund, which now serves as the official residence of the American ambassador to Denmark, was named for the estate.

== History ==
In the early 14th century, Rydhave belonged to members of the Eberstein family. For more than a century, it was operated as a farm under Landting.

In 1523, Landting belonged to Axel Nielsen Rosenkrantz. Upon his death,Landting and Rydhave were passed down to different heirs. Around this time, Rydhave was incorporated as a manor in its own right. Rydhave passed out of the Rosenkrantz family when it was inherited by Anne Kaas, a daughter of Birgitte Rosenkrantz. She married Albert Rostrup.

Rostrup sold Rydhave to Anna Sehested, widow of Claus Sehested who had served as governor of Øsel in present-day Estonia. After her death, Rydhave was passed to her son Malte Sehested. He was married to Margrethe Reedtz, a daughter of Frederik Reedtz. She managed the estate for 30 years after her husband's death. She became the owner of three other manors as well. Rydhave remained in the hands of the Sehested family until 1825.

From 1828 to 1854, Rydhave belonged to Henning Johannes Peter von Bracht. He operated a brickyard on the estate. The brickyard was for a while managed by his son-in-law,Emil Edvard Schnackenburg (1818–1894). Many years later, when the son-in-law constructed a country house in Charlottenlund north of Copenhagen, long after Rydhave had been sold, he chose to name it Villa Rydhave after his father-in-law's former estate.

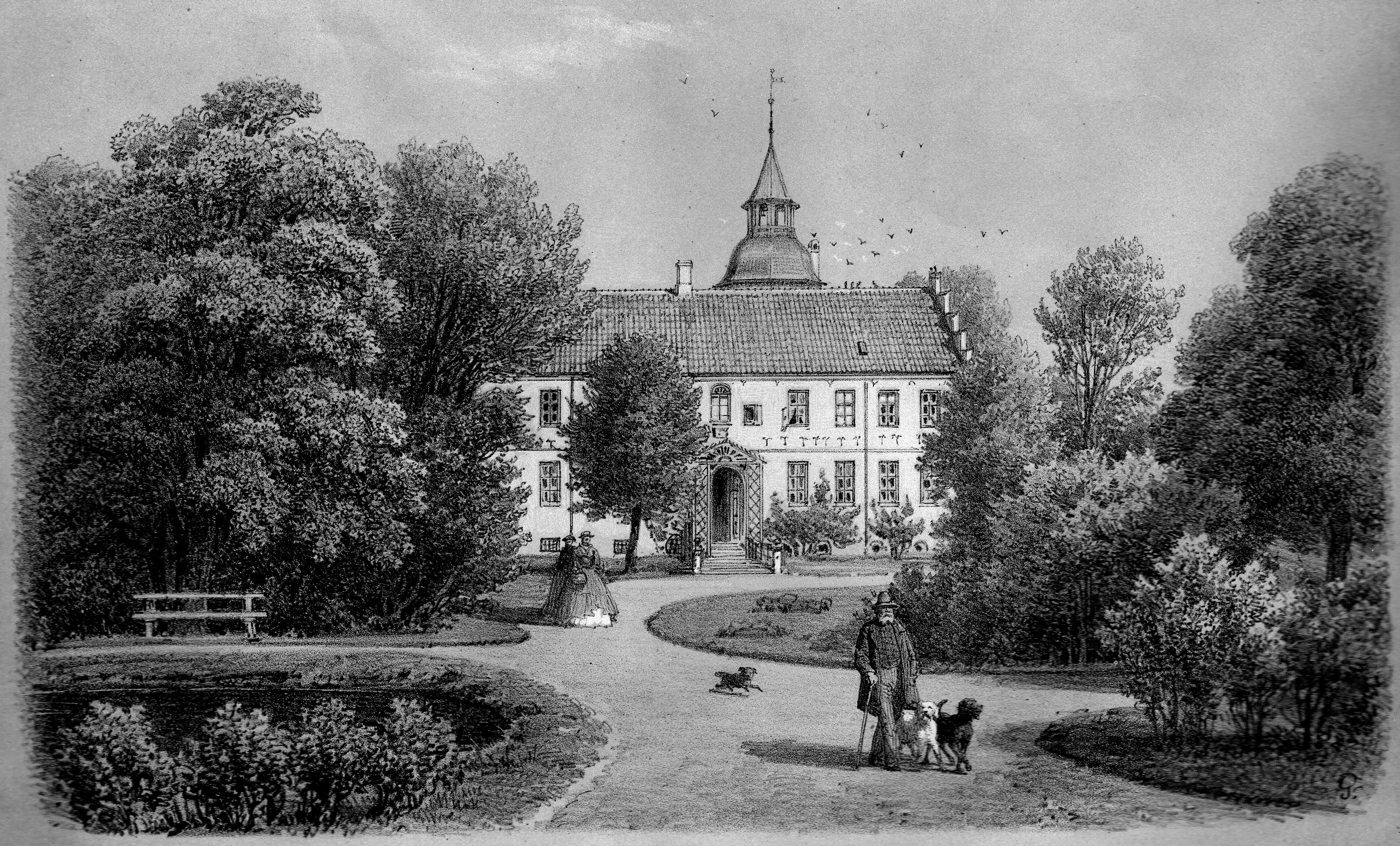
Rydhave in the 1860s, print by Ferdinand Richardt.

In 1865, Rydhave was acquired by count Gregers Christian Raben. He wanted to contribute to improving the cultivation of the extensive heatherland areas of western Jutland. The next owner was count Danneskiold-Samsøe. He planted much of the land with conifers.

In 1910, Rydhave was bought by a consortium and parcelled out. The main building and remaining land was sold to Johanne Jacobsen in 1918. She was the widow of Vagn Jacobsen, a son of Carlsberg-brewer Carl Jacobsen. She undertook a comprehensive renovation of the buildings. In 1956. Rydhave was acquired by thew Inner Mission of Denmark. The prganisation converted the buildings into a Christian school.

== Architecture ==
The main building consists of three wings and a tower. Part of the tower dates from the Middle Ages. It is attached to the north wing. The east wing dates from c. 1550 but was adapted in 1656 and again in 1794. The western wing dates from 1520 to 1530. A wall connects the tower to the western wing. The entire complex was listed in the Danish register of protected buildings and places in 1918.

== List of owners ==
- ( -1377) Albert Andersen Eberstein
- ( -1377) Henrik Albertsen Eberstein
- ( -1422) Ribe Bispestol
- (1422- ) Karen Henriksdatter Albertsen, gift Puder
- ( - )Jens Eriksen
- (1435–1484) Niels Eriksen Gyldenstjerne
- (1484–1486) Boet efter Niels Eriksen Gyldenstjerne
- (1486–1505) Inger Eriksen, gift Rosenkrantz
- (1505–1551) Axel Nielsen Rosenkrantz
- (1551- ) Birgitte Knob, gift Rosenkrantz
- ( -1581) Niels Axelsen Rosenkrantz
- (1581–1592) Timme Rosenkrantz
- (1592–1593) Birgitte Rosenkrantz, gift Kaas
- (1593–1597) Niels Kaas
- (1597–1600) Birgitte Rosenkrantz, gift Kaas
- (1600- ) Anne Kaas, gift Rostrup
- ( -1615) Albert Rostrup
- (1615–1621) Anna Lykke, gift Sehested
- (1621–1661) Malte Sehested
- (1661–1693) Margrethe Frederiksdatter Reedtz, gift Sehested
- (1693–1726) Frederik Sehested
- (1726–1753) Birgitte Sophie Sehested
- (1753–1773) Jens Sehested
- (1773–1775) Elisabeth Birgitte, gift 1) Sehested, 2) Numsen
- (1775–1783) Frederik Numsen
- (1783–1821) Niels Sehested
- (1821–1825) Boet efter Niels Sehested
- (1825–1828) Viborg Stift
- (1828–1854) Henning J. P. Bracht
- (1854–1856) Carl Vilhelm August Christensen
- (1856–1873) G. C. Raben
- (1873–1895) Frederik Vilhelm Steen Danneskiold-Samsøe
- (1895–1910) Eugenie Holstein Ledreborg, gift Danneskiold-Samsøe
- (1910- ) Consortium
- ( -1918) A. Berbom
- (1918–1923) Johanne Jacobsen Christensen
- (1923–1932) O. Skibbild
- (1932–1956) Mette Skibbild
- (1956- ) Rydhave Slots Efterskole
