= Trørød Forest =

Coordinates: 55.845°N 12.556°E

Trørød Forest (Danish: Trørød Skov or Trørød Hegn), between Trørød and Vedbæk, is a small forest in Rudersdal Municipality, approximately 20 kilometres north of Copenhagen, Denmark. It adjoins the bog Maglemosen on the north as well as Enrum Forest.

== History ==
Once an inlet, Vedbæk Fjord, Maglemosen is known for the so-called Maglemosian culture. Trørød Forest contains 39 burial mounds from the late part of the Bronze Age (c. 1000–5000 B. C.).

The forest was owned by the crown but almost disappeared in the 18th century due to deforestation. The current forest is the result of a reforestation programme which began in about 1800.

== Access ==
Access is from Trørødvej, Gøngehusvej, Grisestien, Caroline Mathildevej, Lindevangsvej and Gøngetoften. Two parking lots are available on Trørødvej.
