= Georg Bestle =

Danish wine merchant

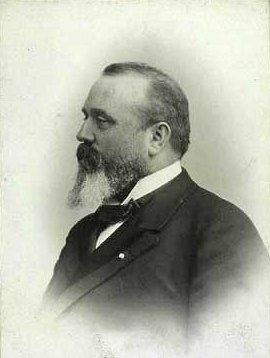
- Bestle photographed by Julie Laurberg
- Born: 18 March 1855; Copenhagen, Denmark
- Died: 6 May 1933 (aged 78); Copenhagen, Denmark
- Occupation: Businessman
- Awards: Commander of the Dannebrog

Georg Christian Bestle (18 March 1855 – 6 May 1933) was a Danish vintner. He established his own company in 1882, which had by the 1890s developed into the largest company of its kind in Denmark. Its former headquarters is located at Skindergade 45–47 in Copenhagen. The current building is from 1900.

== Early life and education ==
Bestle was born on 18 March 1855 in Copenhagen, the son of vintner Christopher Wilhelm Friderich Bestle (1821–1892) and Trine Marie Engelsen (1826–1898). In 1853, his father acquired a wine house, which traced its history back to 1730.

Bestle apprenticed as a wine merchant in his father's company from 1870 and then continued his education abroad where he spent most of his time in Bordeaux.

== Career ==
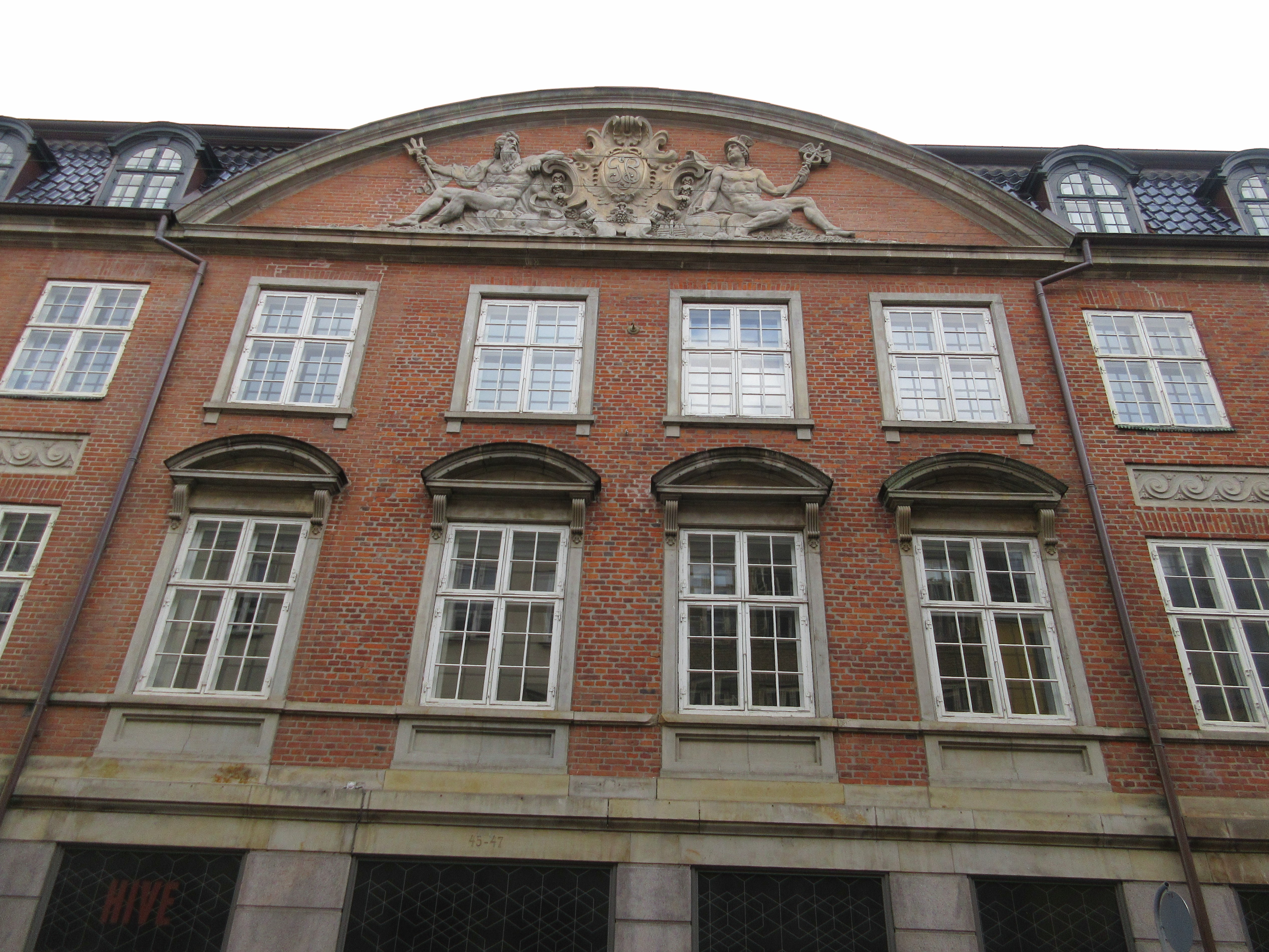
Georg Bestle's former building at Skindergade 45–47 in Copenhagen

Bestle was licensed as a vintner in 1882 and purchased a minor wine store in Nørre Voldgade. In 1886 he also purchased Gottlieb Bonnesen's wine store at Skindergade 47 and moved his business to this address. His wine house experienced a commercial breakthrough in 1888 and over the next few years developed into the largest company of its kind in Denmark. Hans Christian Rodian (1854–1919) was a key employee. He took over his father's wine company in 1892 and merged it with his existing operations in Skindergade. His company was converted into a limited company (aktieselskab) under the name Georg Bestle A/S in connection with his retirement in 1913. He was chairman of the company until circa 1930. Bestle was also chairman of United Wine Import, a company founded in 1919 through the merger of Georg Bestle and Riis & Dreyers vinhandel.

In 1891–1906, he was also a board member of the Danish Vintners' Association (Vinhandlerforeningen for Danmark). His company later relocated to modern premises at Meterbuen 24–28 in Skovlunde.

== Other activities ==
Georg Bestle was interested in the preservation of historic buildings. He was a member and for a while president of the Association for the Preservation of Old Buildings (Foreningen til gamle bygningers Bevaring). He purchased Lindegården in Kalundborg in 1907 and presented it to the National Museum of Denmark as a gift in 1911.

He succeeded his father as member of the church inspectorate for the Church of the Holy Spirit and through a number of donations contributed significantly to its interior decoration. He was also a board member of Aktieselskabet til oprettelsen af billige pantelånerkontorer i København and a driving force behind the establishment of Understøttelsesfondet in 1924.

He established Etatsraad Georg Bestle and Hustrus Mindelegat in 1932.

== Personal life ==
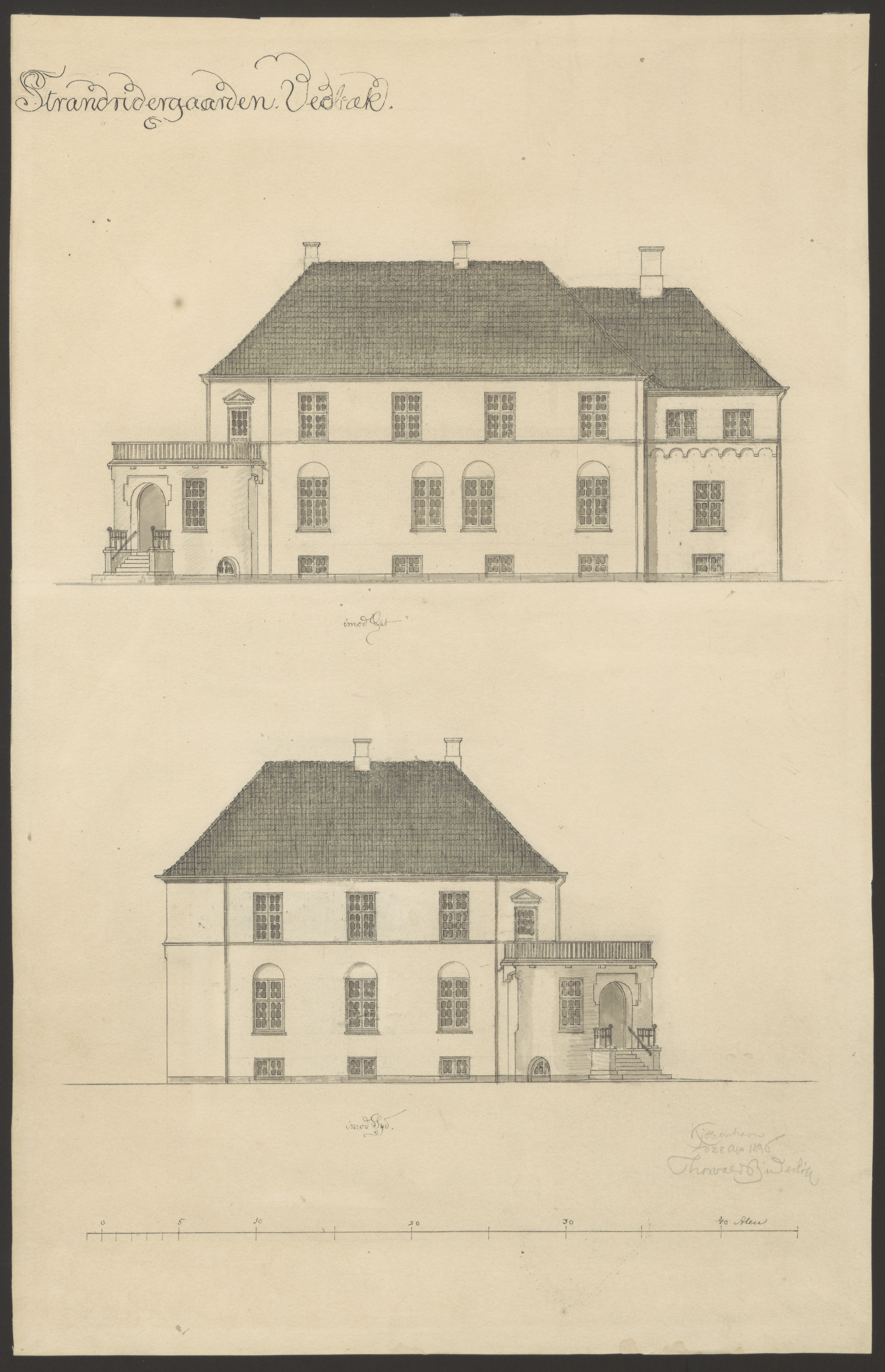
Bindesbøll's drawing of Bestle's house at Vedbæk Strandvej 506 (1897).

Bestle married twice. His first wife was Caroline Sophie Hassert (6 January 1851 – 3 February 1916), a daughter of merchant Hennau Ferdinand H. (c. 1808–1882) and Caroline Amalie Svendsen (1812–1887). They married on 14 May 1880 in the Church of the Holy Spirit in Copenhagen. His second wife was Selma Anna Elisabeth Blaumüller Fleisner (30 April 1866 – 30 June 1947), a daughter of a weaver named Anton Georg F. (1833–1885) and Vilhelmine Caroline Schoch (c. 1840–1869). They married on 2 November 1916.

In 1897, he charged Thorvald Bindesbøll with the design of a house in Vedbæk. It is located at Vedbæk Strandvej 506.

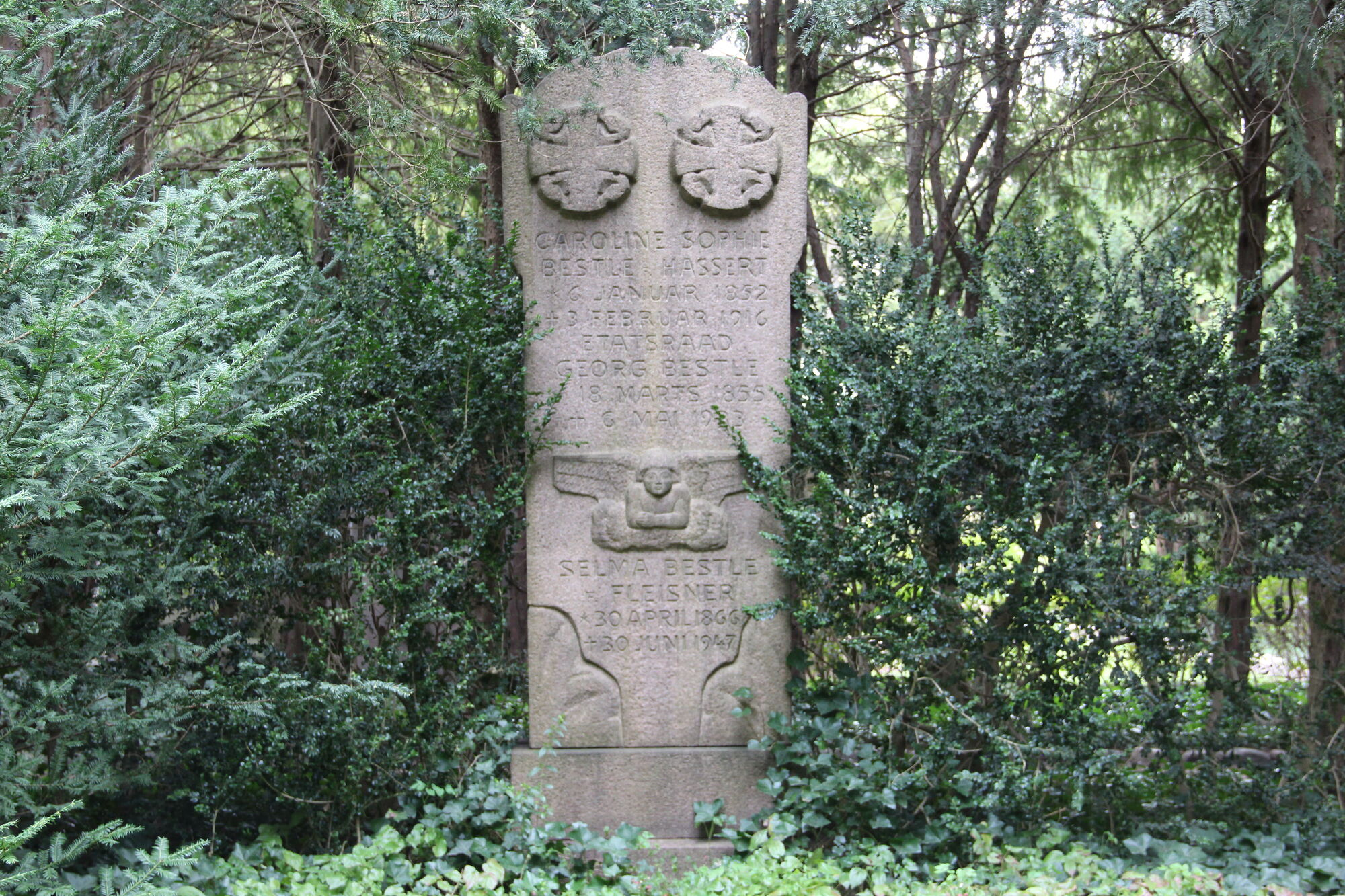
Bestle's tombstone at Copenhagen's Eestern Cemetery.

Bestle was awarded the honorary title of etatsråd in 1900. In 893, he was appointed Knight in the Order of the Dannebrog. In 1894, he was awarded the Cross of Merit. In In 1911, he was appointed as second-class Commander of the Order of the Dannebrog. In 1930, he became a first-class Commander.

He died on 6 May 1933 and is buried in Copenhagen'sWesternCemetery.
