= Listed buildings in Holstebro Municipality =

This list of listed buildings in Jolstebro Municipality is a list of listed buildings in Halsnæs Municipality, Denmark.

== The list ==
Listing name	Image	Location	Year built	Contributing resource	Ref
Bomhuset ved Sønderlandsgade		Sønderlandsgade 46, 7500 Holstebro	1794	House from 1794	Ref4
Borbjerg Holmgård		Bukdalvej 52, 7500 Holstebro	c. 1750	Main building with side wing from c. 1750	Ref
Handbjerg Hovgård		Handbjerg Hovgårdvej 5, 7830 Vinderup	1755	The three-winged main building from 1755, a later extension of the north wing and the 10 linden trees on the courtyard	Ref
Holstebro Town Hall		Nørregade 25, 7500 Holstebro	1804	Combined town hall and jailhouse from 1846 designed by N. S. Nebelong	Ref
Holstebro station		Stationsvej 15, 7500 Holstebro		Railway station frp, 1904 designed by Heinrich Wenck	Ref
Nyboe House (2)		Østergade 35-37, 7500 Holstebro	1793	Townhouse from 1793	Ref
Nørre Vosborg (9)		Vembvej 35, 7570 Vemb		Manor house	Ref
Rydhave		Holstebrovej 38A, 7830 Vinderup		Three-winged manor house consisting of am ast wing built in c. 1550 and adapted in 1656 and again in 1794, north wing with tower from the Middle Ages and west wing from c. 1520-30 as well as the wall between the tower and west wing	Ref
Udstrup		Udstrupvej 3, 6990 Ulfborg	1784	Three-winged main building from 1784	Ref
