= Strandridergaarden =

Danish historic country house

Coordinates: 55.8620°N 12.5604°E

Strandridergården is a historic country house situated on Vedbæk Strandvej (No. 506) in Vedbæk, Rudersdal Municipality, some 30 km north of Copenhagen, Denmark. It was built in 1895 for vintner Georg Bestle to designs by architect and designer Thorvald Bindesbøll.

== History ==
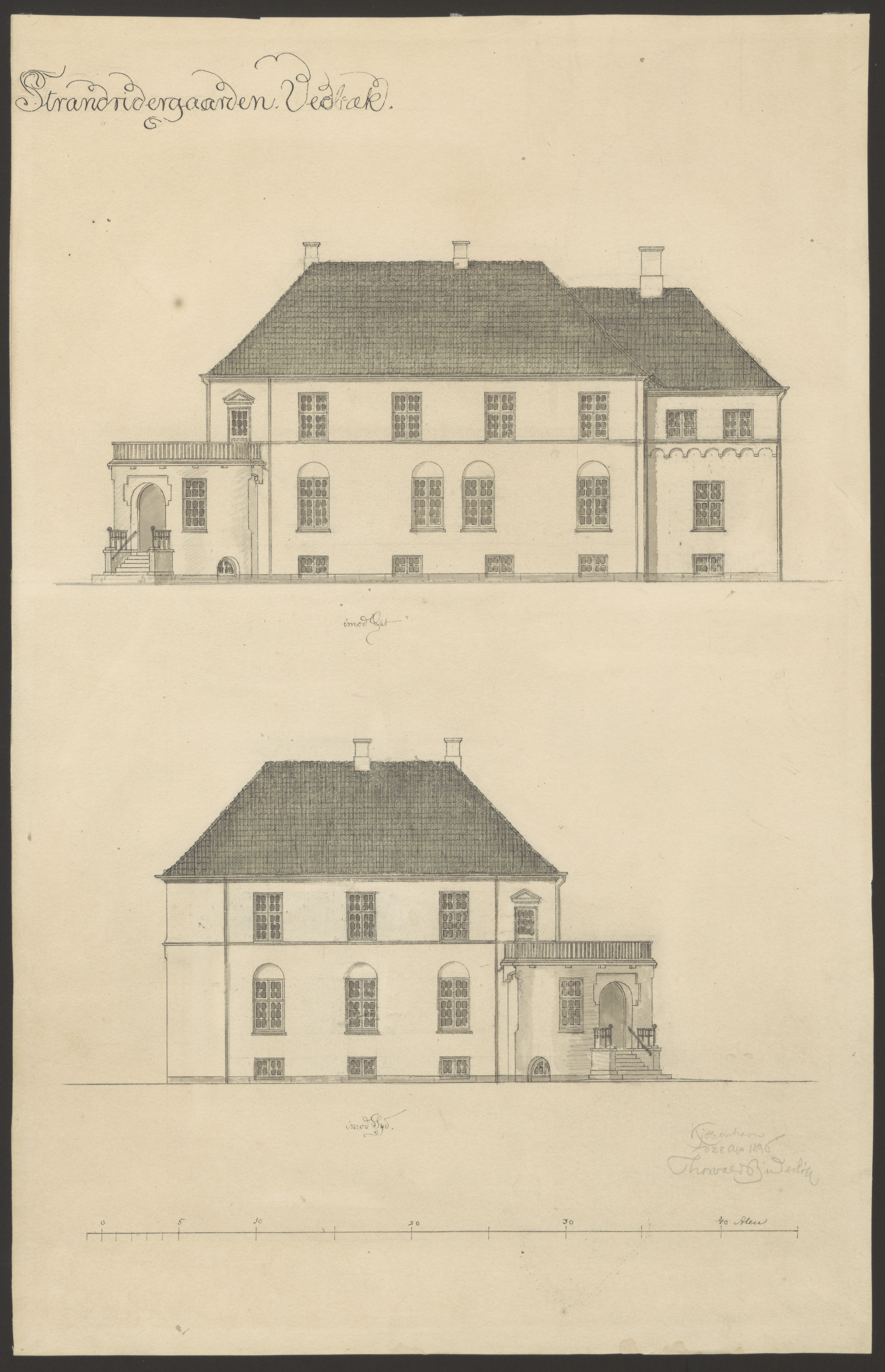
One of Bindesbøll's renderings.

The history of the property dates back to 1811. In 1876. it was acquired by vintner C.W.F. Bestle (1822-1892) and used as his summer residence. The current main building was built in 1895 for his son Georg Bestle. It was designed by Thorvald Bindesbøll. Bestle served as president of the Association for the Preservation of Old Buildings (’Foreningen til gamle Bygningers Bevarelse). The house stood on a 3.5-hectare (7 tønder) piece of land but most of the land was later sold off in lots.

The original lot was later parceled out, but with 11.780 m^{2} it is still quite large.

The house was in 1951 adapted for use as an orphanage by Poul Henningsen.

The orphanage closed in June 2013.

The building was sold to members of the Evers Thomsen family for DKK 27 million. It was in 2018–2020 subject to a comprehensive adaption. It was in 2020 nominated for the Danish Renovation Award (Renover Prisen) but has resulted in a dispute with Rudersdal Municipality over the legality of some of the alterations.
