= Peter van Hurk =

Dutch-Danish merchant

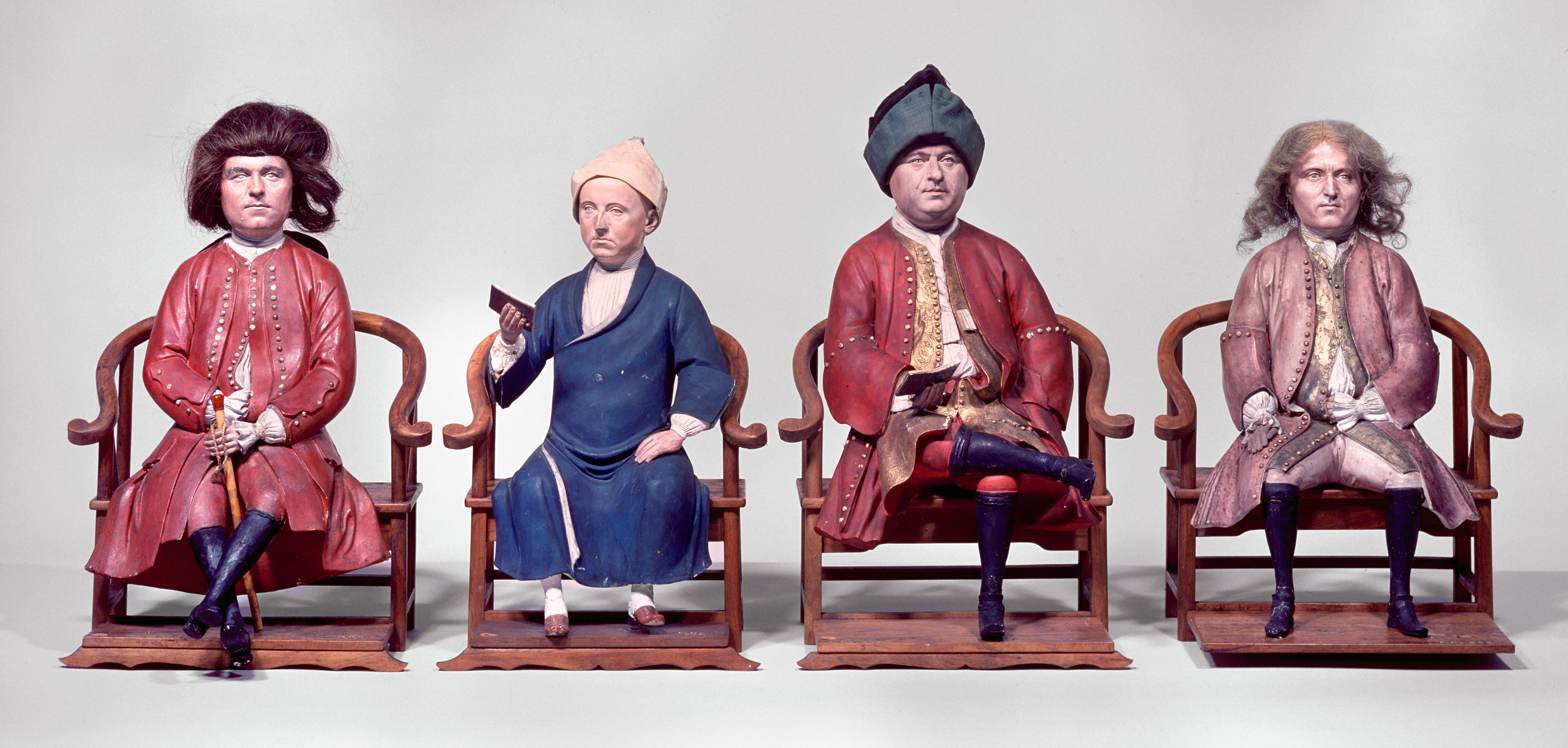
Clay figures created in Canton of crew members of Kronprins Christian in 1831: Peter van Hurk is number two from the left.

Peter van Hurk (1697 – 16 October 1775) was a Dutch-Danish merchant.

== Biography ==
Peter van Hurk was born in the Netherlands. Due to his experience with trade with China, he was called to Denmark by Fabritius & Wewer to serve as 1st Supercargo on board the ship Kronprins Christian on its first journey to China. The expedition was a great success and he was subsequently a co-founder of the Danish Asiatic Company where he was a partner from 1732 to 1745 and director from 1745 to 1754. Together with Reinhard Iselin, he was in opposition to the transformation of the company and the liberalization of Danish trade on East Asia. Together with five other participants, he filed a lawsuit but lost.

Peter van Hurk was also involved in the establishment of Kurantbanken and served as commissioner of banking from 1739 to 1774. He took over the Royal Danish Silk Manufactury in Copenhagen in 1753.

== Personal life ==
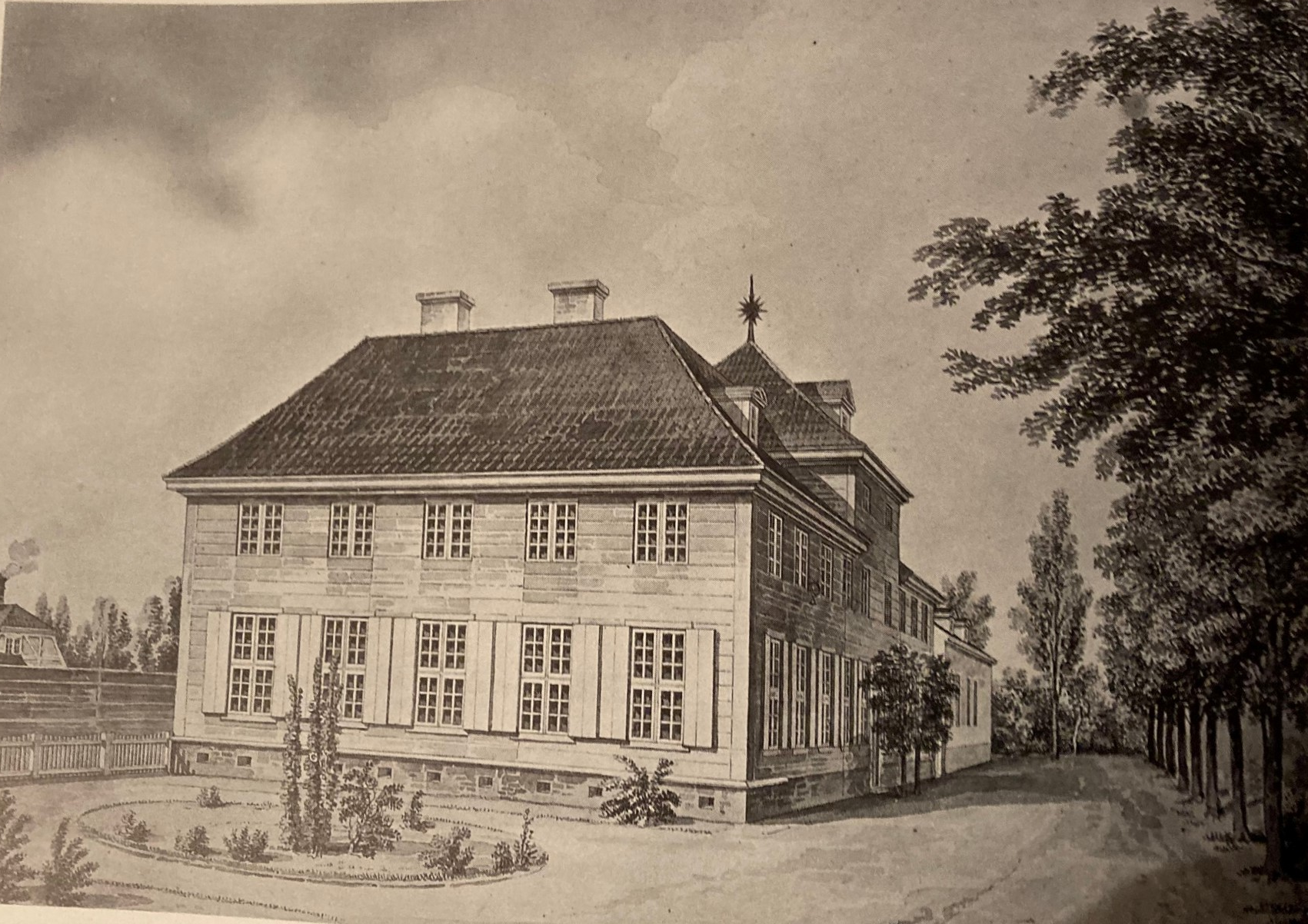
Sneglebakken

He was the owner of the property Sneglebakken in Kongens Lyngby from 1734 to 1760. In 1768, he acquired Rustenborg from Jean Henri Desmercières.

On 15 January 1744 in the German Reformed Church in Copenhagen, he married Maria Barbara Fabritius. She was the sister of Just and Michael Fabritius.

He was appointed kommerceråd in 1733, agent with rank of justitsråd in 1749 and etatsråd in 1753.
