= Enrum =

Listed mansion in Vedbæk, Rudersdal Municipality, Denmark

Coordinates: 55.8456°N 12.5690°E

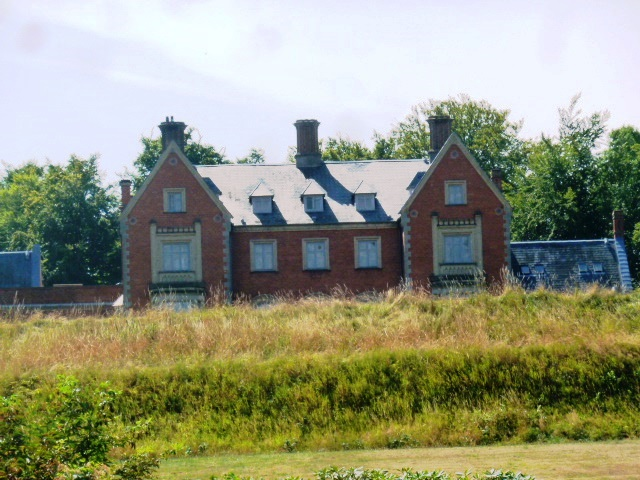
Enrum

Enrum is a listed mansion on Strandvejen in Vedbæk, Rudersdal Municipality, some 20 kilometres north of Copenhagen, Denmark. The history of the property dates back to 1731 but the current main building was built in the 1860s to a design by Johan Daniel Herholdt. Enrum is today owned by nemlig.com founder Stefan Plenge.

== History ==
=== 18th century ===
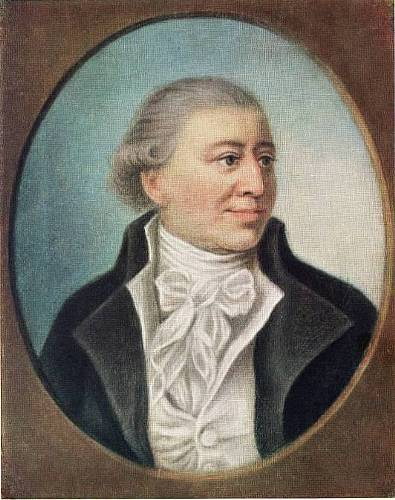
Conrad Alexander Fabritius-Tengnagel

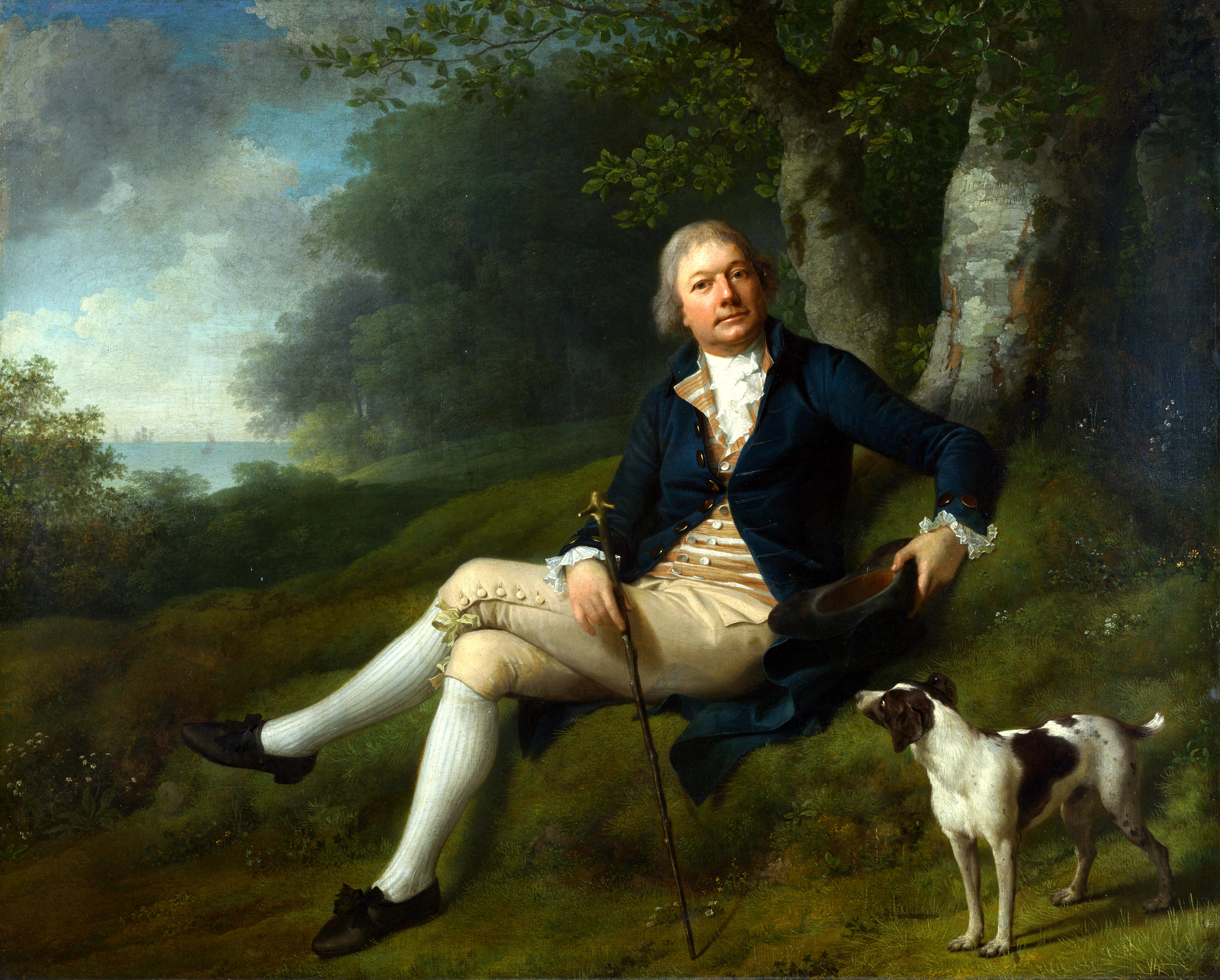
Hoseph Greenway painted in Enrum's park by Jens Juel, 1788

In 1731, royal cabinet secretary Georg Christian Jacobi acquired a piece of land from princess Sophia Hedwig on the coast north of Copenhagen and constructed a small country retreat at the site for his own use. The name Enrum is first recorded in 1733. In 1745, Jacobi sold the house to Michael Fabritius, a co-founder of the Danish Asiatoc Company as well as Kurantbanken. After his death in 1845, his wife, Anna Maria de Longueville, increased the size of the estate through acquisition of new land. After her death in 1775, their son, Conrad Fabritius, bought out the other heirs. He constructed a new main building and spend considerable sums on the park. In 1778, he was ennobled under the name Fabritius de Tengnagel.

=== 18th century ===
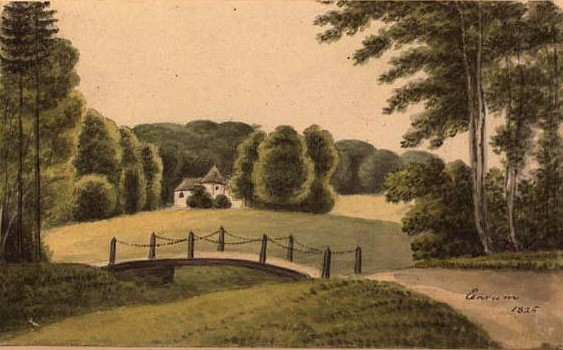
Ole Jørgen Rawert: Enrum

In 1805, Fabricius' widow sold Enrum to Christian Colbjørnsen, Denmark's Chief Justice since 1802. In 1811 he sold Enrum to Peder Andreas Kolderup Rosenvinge, director general of the Royal Danish Postal Services, who only owned the property until 1814. The new owner was Johan Frederik Gyldenstierne Sehested, a military officer, and after his death in 1833 the estate came under Det Sehestedske Fideikommis. a family foundation.

Enrum was in 1845 acquired by Count Christian Conrad Sophus Danneskiold-Samsøe, who also owned the Holmegård Estate at Næstved. He commissioned Johan Daniel Herholdt to design a new house which was completed in 1864. Count Danneskiold-Samsøe spent his summers on the estate where the Danish Royal Family and the Russian tsar family were among his guests.

=== 20th century ===
Enrum remained in the hands of the Danneskiold-Samsøe family until 1939 when it was sold to the Independent Order of Odd Fellows. They used it as a holiday resort for their members until 1984 when it was sold once again.

Enrum was later converted into offices by TK Development. From 2005 it served as company headquarters for Stones Invest. In 2013 it was sold in auction for DKK 72 million. In 2017, Enrum was purchased by nemlig.com-founder Stefan Plenge for DKK 49 million.

== Architecture ==
Enrum is built in red brick in a style which is inspired by English country seats. The main building with lateral wings in stables was listed in 1984.

== Enrum Forest ==
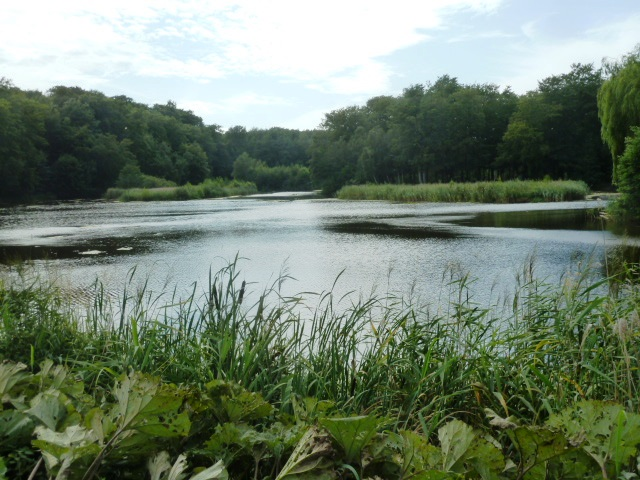
Enrum Pond

Enrum Forest has an area of 31 hectares. It adjoins Trørød Forest and is open to the public since it has been leased by the Danish Nature Agency on a 50 years contract. It southern part is covered by a small lake, Enrum Pond (Enrum Dam), a boggy area and meadows. The rest is mainly beech forest. In the western part of the forest, in the central axis of the main building, stands the Friendship Column. In the northern part of the forest stands King Charles' Spring (Kong Carls Kilde), which supposedly catered to King Charles XII of Sweden during the departure of his troops from Vedbæk Harbour in 1700.

== Cultural associations ==
Enrum features in season 3 of the television series The Killing as the stately home of the Zeuthen Family.

== List of owners ==
(listen er ikke komplet)

- (1731-1745) Georg Christian Jacobi
- (1745-1746) Michael Fabritius
- (1746-1775) Anna Maria Köster
- (1775-1805) Conrad Fabritius de Tengnagel
- (1805-1806) Debora Kloppenburg
- (1806-1811) Peder Andreas Kolderup Rosenvinge
- (1811-1814) Christian Colbjørnsen
- (1814-1833) Johan Frederik Gyldenstierne Sehested
- (1833-1845) Det Sehedstedske Fideicommis
- (1845-1886) Christian Conrad Sophus Danneskiold-Samsøe
- (1886-1908) Ernest Danneskiold-Samsøe
- (1908-1939) Aage Conrad Danneskiold-Samsøe
- (1939-1984) Odd Fellow Ordenen
- (1984-2005) Ukendte ejere
- (2005-2007) TK Development
- (2007-2012) Steen Gude, Stones Invest
- (2012-2013) Husmer Holding
- (2013-2014) Slottet Enrum A/S
- (2014-2016) Finansiel Stabilitet
- (2016 -) Signe Rosenvinge Thürmer & Stefan Plenge
