= Malte Sehested =

Danish military officer and landowner

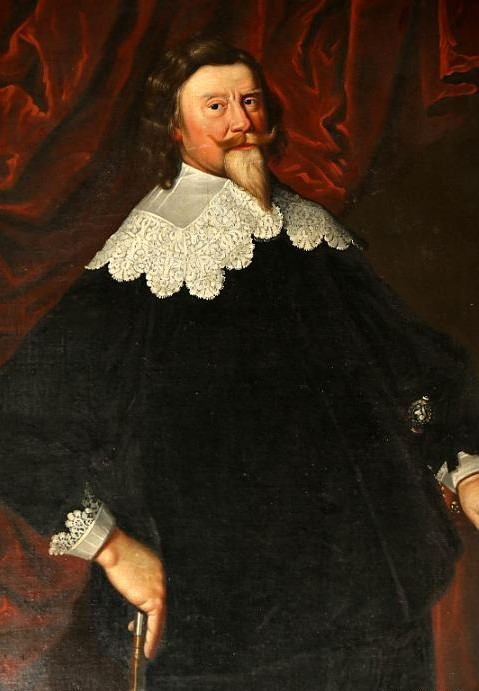
Malte Sehested.

Malte Sehested (13 November 1596 - 20 July 1661) was a Danish army officer and landowner.

== Early life ==
Sehested was born at Arensborg Castle on Øsel, Duchy of Estonia, which was under the rule of Magnus, Duke of Holstein (1540–1583), younger son of King Christian III of Denmark. Sehested's father Claus Maltesen Sehested (1558–1612) was governor (statholder( of the island. His mother was Anne Nielsdatter Lykke (1568–1645). He was brother of Hannibal Sehested (1609–1666), Mogens Sehested, Karen Sehested and Sophie Sehested.

== Military career ==
In 1612, aged 15, Sehested became page to the Polish field marshal Jan Karol Chodkiewicz. He was later promoted first to squire (kammerjunker) and then to rittmeister in Chodkiewicz company. He participated in battles against Swedish, Russian, Hungarian and Turkish troops. Shortly after returning to Denmark, in 1621, he returned to Denmark. Not long thereafter, he and his brother went to France and Spain. In 1828, when Denmark engaged in the Thirthy Year War, he once again returned to Denmark to join the Danish army. In

== Holdings ==
In 1648–53, Sehested was lensmann (fiefholder) of Stavanger in Norway. In he exchanged it for Åstrup.

In 1616, he purchased Ussinggård at Hedensted (sold in 1636). He inherited the estate Rydhave in western Jutland from his mother. He had also inherited a stake in Højriis but sold it i 1637 to his brother-in-law Erik Juel. In the same year, he bought Boller. Through his first marriage, he came into possession of the estates Sæbygård (1627–38) and Hørbygård (1627–38), both in Northern Jutland.

== Personal life ==
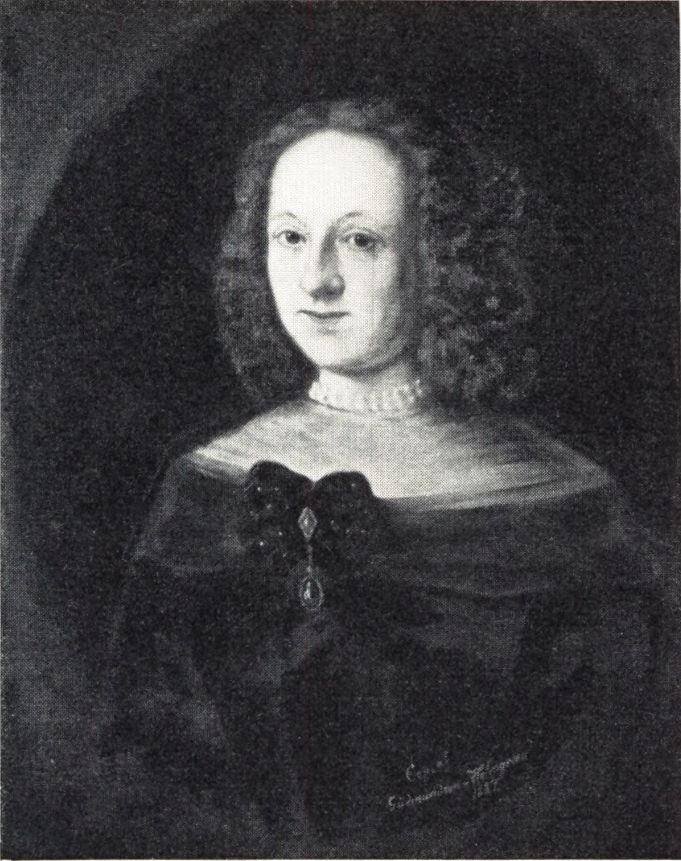
Margrethe Frederiksdatter Reedtz.

On 22 April 1627, in Aalborg, Sehested married to Sophie Brahe (1580–1638). She was the widow of rigsmarsk Peder Munk (1535–1623). After her death, on 25 September 1640, in Viborg, he married secondly to Margrethe Reedtz (died 1697). She was the daughter of privy councillor Frederik Reedtz (1586–1659) and Birgitte Brahe (1591–1627).

His son Frederik Sehested inherited Rydhave. His younger brother Jens Maltesen Sehested (1651–1730) reached the rank of major-general in the Royal Danish Army. Their sister Birgitte Sophie Maltesdatter Sehested (1644–1728) was married to county governor and landowner Jørgen Grubbe Kaas.
