= Johan Friederich Wewer =

Danish merchant

Johan Friederich Wewer (8 March 1699 – 9 May 1759) was a Danish merchant and ship-owner. He was a co-founder of Fabritius & Wewer and was also active in the Danish West India Company, Danish Asia Company, Danish Africa Company and the Royal Greenland Trading Department.

== Early life and education ==
Wewer was born in Kleve. He was probably called to Copenhagen by Michael Fabritius with whom he founded Fabritius & Wewer in 1740. There was an attempt to set up a trade route to the Levant, but the company prospered from trade on the Danish colonies. Peter Fenger and Johann Ludvig Zinn both worked for the firm in the beginning of their careers.

Wewer was also active in most of the chartered companies of his time. He served as one of the directors of the Danish West India Company from 1746 and was from 1752 also one of the directors of the Danish Asia Company. In 1754, he purchased the Danish West India Company's buildings and quay at Christianshavn. He was also involved in the Royal Greenland Trading Department and was in 1755 appointed as director of the Danish Africa Company. He was appointed as royal agent in 1743 and as etatsråd in 1754.

== Other activities ==
Wewer was also appointed as overformynder and one of the directors of Opfostringshuset. He was also a member of the commission for the construction of Frederick's German Church in Chrisitianshavn.

== Personal life ==
Wewer's business partner, Michael Fabritius, died in 1746. Wewer married his widow, Anna Maria Fabritius née Köster, on 19 January 1748.

Wewer died on 9 May 1759 and was initially buried in the chapel of the Church of Golmen but was later moved to Frederick's German Church. His widow married major-general Jean Baptiste Descariéres de Longueville (1699–1766) in 1763.
