= Fabritius de Tengnagel (noble family) =

- Noble family
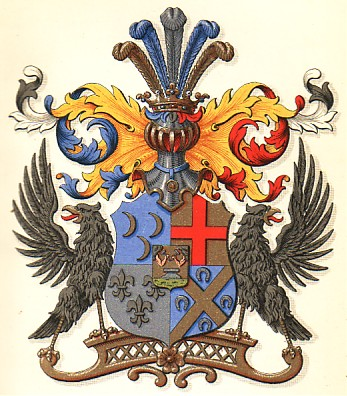
- Country: Denmark; Norway
- Origin: Brandenburg, Germany
- Founded: 4 September 1778
- Founder: Johannes Fabritius

The Fabritius de Tengnagel family is a Danish and Norwegian noble family of German origin.

== History ==
The family originated from Johannes Fabritius (1620–71) of Brandenburg, Prussia. The genus immigrated to Denmark with his son Herman Fabritius (1667-1729). Conrad Alexander Fabritius (1731–1805) and Michael Fabritius (1739–1815), as well as all legitimate children of their then-deceased father Michael Fabritius (1697-1746), were on 4 September 1778 ennobled by letters patent under the name Fabritius de Tengnagel.

== Notable family members ==
Conrad Fabritius de Tengnagel (1731–1805)m businessman

- Frederik Michael Ernst Fabritius de Tengnagel (1781–1849), landscape painter
- Conrad Fabritius de Tengnagel
- Signe Frigg Fabritius de Tengnagel Tscherning Jønsson
- Ronja Frigg Fabritius de Tengnagel Tscherning Jønsson
- Felix Frigg Fabritius de Tengnagel Tscherning Jønsson
- Amy Jeyasri Frigg Fabritius de Tengnagel Tscherning Jønsson Larsen

== See also ==
- Danish nobility
- Norwegian nobility

== Literature ==
- Dansk Adelskalender (1878): Fabritius de Tengnagel at skislekt.no/adel.
- A. Thiset og P.L. Wittrup: Nyt dansk Adelslexikon, Copenhagen 1904
- Sven Tito Achen: Danske adelsvåbener, Copenhagen 1973
