= Carl Baagøe =

Danish painter

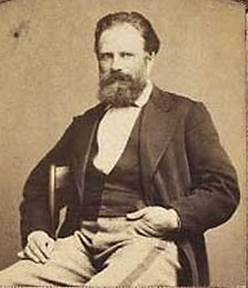
Carl Baagøe (date unknown)

Carl Emil Baagøe (22 August 1829, Copenhagen – 16 April 1902, Snekkersten) was a Danish marine painter.

== Biography ==
His father was a sailing master. He displayed artistic talent at an early age and was given drawing lessons. He also had access to classes at the Royal Danish Academy of Fine Arts. In 1848, after becoming a journeyman decorative painter, he impoverished himself by frequenting the dockyards, working on his desire to become a marine artist, rather than attending to his work.

By 1855, he decided that he had mastered his craft and began exhibiting his seascapes. In 1864, he received a small grant to study abroad from the Royal Danish Academy. Throughout his life, he would make numerous voyages to collect material for his works; notably to Iceland (1855) and Norway (1866, 1868). He tended to prefer quiet scenes with still water or fishermen's villages. His works were very popular in England. He also provided illustrations for the Illustreret Tidende.
