= Trørød =

Suburban district in Rudersdal Municipality

Coordinates: 55°50′N 12°33′E

Trørød is a suburban district in Rudersdal Municipality, located approximately 20 kilometres north of central Copenhagen, Denmark. The original village has merged with the neighbouring communities of Vedbæk and Gammel Holte and now form the southernmost part of the urban agglomeration of Hørsholm. It is on the other sides surrounded by open farmland and the forests Jægersborg Hegn, Kohave Forest and Trørød Forest.

== History ==
The name is recorded in 1370-80 as Thryrwth, which is derived from thrȳ, old Danish for the number three, and -rød, meaning "clearing in the forest" ("rudning). In 1682 Trørød consisted of 7 farms and 3 houses with no ground.

In 1682 Trørød consisted of 7 farms and 3 houses without land. The total cultivated area was 117.2 barrels of land owed to 40.50 barrels of hart grain. The cultivation system was all-purpose use. In 1635, the relative distribution of seeds was: 48% carpet, 39% barley, 13% oats.

In Trørød, there lived 313 inhabitants in 1906, in 1911 342 inhabitants, in 1916 439 inhabitants, in 1921 596 inhabitants, in 1925 796 inhabitants, in 1930 887 inhabitants, in 1935 874 inhabitants, in 1940 931 inhabitants, in 1945 971 and in 2024 21537 inhabitants.

In 1911, Trørød had 342 inhabitants, of which 119 subsisted on agriculture, 126 on crafts and industry and 22 on trade.

== Description ==
Today the neighbourhood mainly consists of single-family detached homes from the 1960s. The commercial centre is Trørød Torv, a retail development from 1971. A few of the old farmhouses have been preserved in the area to the southwest of Trørød Torv.

== Surroundings ==
Trørød Forest and the Frydenlund estate are located on the northeast side of Trørød. Kohave Forest (Kohave Skov) is a small wooded area located between Trørød and Gammel Holte. Jægersborg Hegn adjoins the Mølleåen river, which separates it from Jægersborg Dyrehave to the south.
