= Michael Fabritius =

Danish merchant (1697–1746)

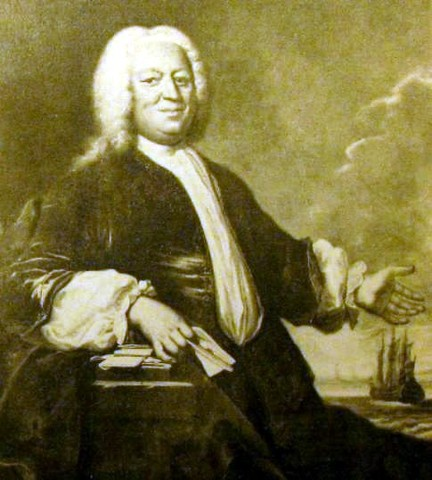
- Fabritius in 1742
- Born: 2 May 1697; Copenhagen, Denmark
- Died: 13 November 1746 (aged 49); Copenhagen, Denmark
- Occupation: Merchant

Michael Fabritius (2 May 1697 – 13 November 1746) was a Danish merchant, shipowner and shipbuilder. Together with Johan Friederich Wewer he was the owner of Fabritius & Wewer, a trading house which supplied the Danish government with a wide range of products. The company operated a large fleet of merchant ships and was also involved in shipbuilding. Fabritius was also a co-founder and one of the first directors of the Danish Asiatic Company.

== Early life and education ==
Michael Fabritius was born in Copenhagen on 12 May 1697. His parents, wine merchant Herman Fabritius (1667–1729) and Elisabeth Marie Abbestée (1677–1752), were immigrants from Germany and belonged to the city's German Reformed congregation. Michael Fabritius was the elder brother of Just Fabritius.

== Career ==
Fabritius was granted citizenship as a merchant in 1732. He was one of the first Danish merchants to send ships to China and was a co-founder of Det Kinesiske Societet. He was also active in Danish Asiatic Company. In 1735, he purchased the Grønnegård Harbour at the southern tip of Christianshavn.

In 1738, he was one of the driving forces behind the foundation Kurantbanken and for a while served as its managing director. Together with Johan Friederich Wewer he was the founder of the Fabritius & Wewer trading house.

Like the other major merchants of his time, Michael Fabritius had close ties to the government, providing it with loans and participating in the equipping of ships in connection with expeditions to overseas destinations. He also provided the state with goods such as saltpeter for the manufacture of gunpowder. He became an agent with rank of justitsråd in 1743.

== Personal life ==
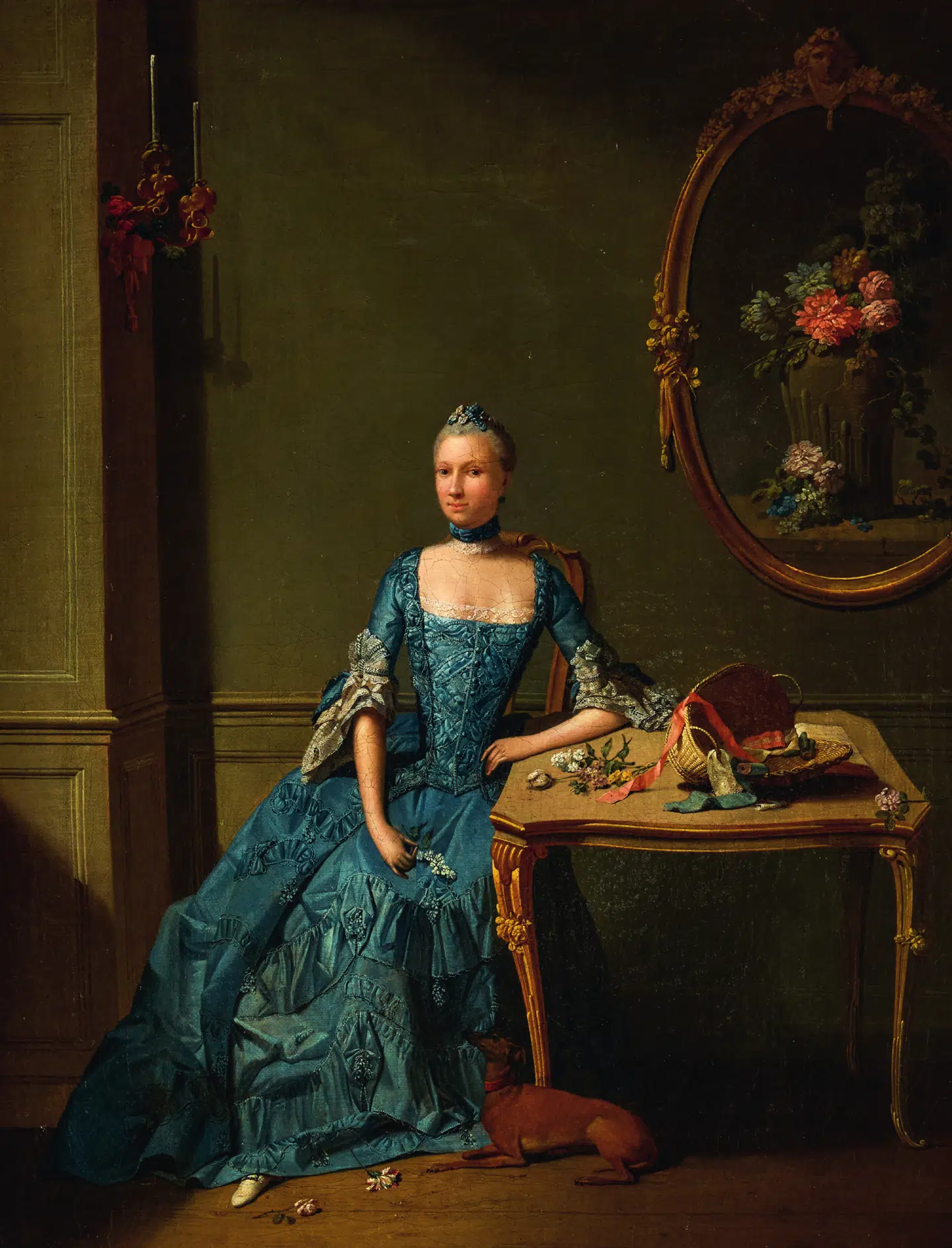
Anne Marie de Køster painted by Peter Cramer, 1762.

Michael Fabritius married Anna Maria Köster (17 November 1705 in Frankfurt – 18 March 1775) on 30 May 1726 in Mühlheim. Their two sons, Michael and Conrad Alexander, were ennobled by letters patent on 4 May 1776 under the name Fabritius de Tengnagel. In 1734, Fabritius purchased the country house Enrum north of Copenhagen. The elder of Fabritius' two daughters, Anna Elisabeth, married Reinhard Iselin. Their younger daughter, Charlotte, married shipowner, merchant and textile manufacturer Peter van Hemert.

Fabritius died in 1746 and was buried at Holmens Cemetery. His widow married his business partner Johann Fr. Wewer in 1748 and, after his death, Major-General Jean Baptiste Descariéres de Longueville (1699–1766). She died in 1775 and was buried at Christian's German Church.

== See also ==
- Peter van Hurk
- Johann Ludvig Zinn
