= Vedbæk =

Neighbourhood in north Copenhagen

Coordinates: 55.853°N 12.565°E

Vedbæk is a wealthy suburban neighbourhood on the coast north of Copenhagen, Denmark. It belongs to Rudersdal Municipality and has merged with the town of Hørsholm to the north. The area has been inhabited for at least 7,000 years, as evidenced by the discovery of a Mesolithic cemetery of the Ertebølle culture. By the 16th century, there were a few small farms and fishermen's houses on the site and in the 18th century, well-to-do townsfolk from Copenhagen started to build country houses in the area. After a paddle steamer began to call at Vedbæk on its journey from Copenhagen to Helsingør, there was an influx of visitors. There are a number of large country houses and a historic church. There has been a railway station for some time and there are popular sandy beaches to the north and south. Enrum Forest is open to the public and provides recreational facilities.

== History ==
=== Prehistoric times ===
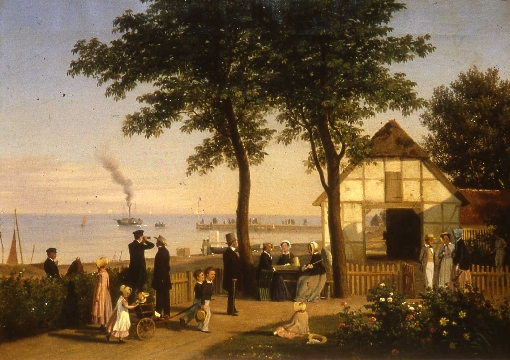
A family is relaxing in the garden at Vedbæk Inn. The paddle steamer is dropping off tourists in the background and there are fishing boats on the beach. Painting by Andreas Juel, 1853

The Vedbæk area has been inhabited for at least 7,000 years as evidenced by the so-called Vedbæk Finds from the Bøgebakken archaeological site, a Mesolithic cemetery of the Ertebølle culture. The cemetery is located in the northern part of the Maglemosen peat bog, and was discovered in 1975 during excavation for the new Vedbæk School. (It should not be confused with the earlier Maglemosian culture, named for a different Maglemose near Slagelse.) An example of the findings of this culture cemetery include the bodies of a young woman with a necklace made of teeth, and her newborn baby. The child is cradled in the wing of a swan with a flint knife at its hip. The child's gravegoods suggest that the culture involved ascribed status – the passing of power between generations. The brief statistical findings of the cemetery are as follows; 22 individual bodies (4 newborns), 17 of the adults buried could be aged – 8 died before reaching the age of 20. There were 9 men, 5 of them over the age of 50, and 8 women: 2 died before the age of 20, 3 living to over 40. Two women died in childbirth (including the young woman mentioned above) and were buried with their newborns beside them. Infant mortality rate is around 35%. Mortality rate is 50%. Reasons for these high death rates could be physiological or cultural.

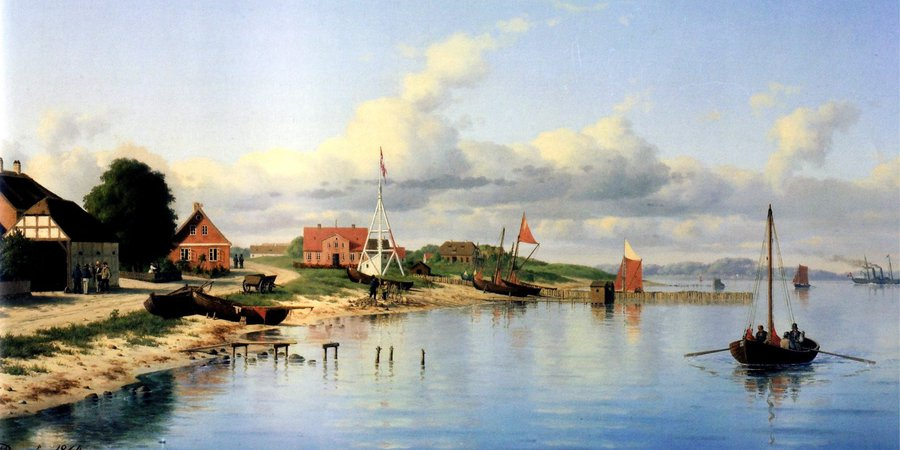
Vedbæk, seen from the pier, 1864, Carl Baagøe

=== 16th to 19th century ===
The name Vedbæk is known from 1535 and is derived from with, Old Danish for 'forest', and bæk, meaning 'stream'. The original village consisted of small farms and fishermen's houses. Five families were occupied with fishing in 1787.

In the 18th century, several country houses were built in the area by well-to-do citizens from Copenhagen.

Denmark's first steam ship, the paddle steamer Caledonia, operated between Copenhagen and Helsingør, calling in Vedbæk on the way. It saved the summer visitors the dusty trip along the Coast Road (Strandvejen), leading to a significant increase in the influx of tourists.

=== 20th century urbanisation ===
Vedbæk Station opened in 1897, leading to increased urbanization.

The Denmark national football team trained at Vedbæk Stadion (staying at the nearby Hotel Marina) for 25 years, before relocating to Helsingør in 2008.

Between 1973 and 2006, the Danish Defence Command was located in Vedbæk.

The town's harbour was constructed during 1917–19.

== Landmarks ==
=== Historic houses ===
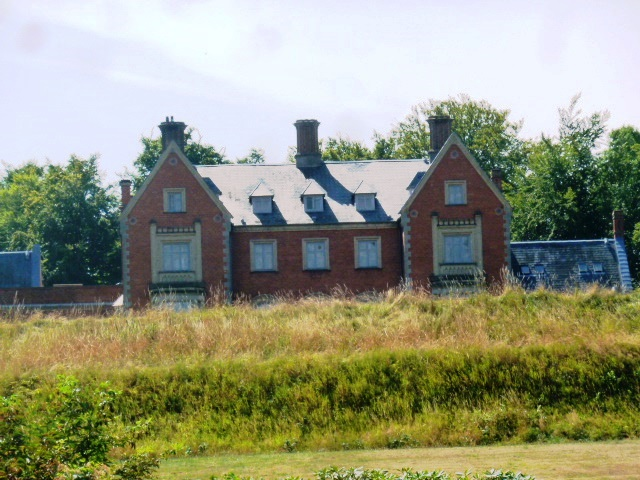
Enrum

Enrum is the oldest and largest of the old country houses in Vedbæk. The first house was built in 1731 by royal servant Georg Chr. Jakobi on land that belonged to the king. A later owner was the merchant Conrad Alexander de Tengnagel who built a new house surrounded by a grandiose Romantic park. In 1845, he sold Enrum to count Christian Danneskiold-Samsøe, the owner of Gisselfeld. He commissioned Johan Daniel Herholdt to design a new house which was completed in English style in The house has now been converted into offices.

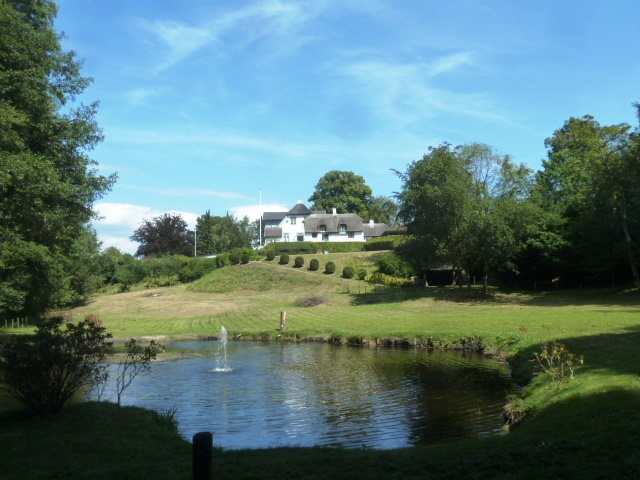
Sølyst

Sølyst was built for G.B.G. Sehested in 1847 to designs by Niels Sigfred Nebelong. The house was altered in 1915.

Miramara (Vedbæk Stradvej 350) is located on a hill just south of Vedbæk Marina. The house was built by textile manufacturer William Salomonsen in 1887 on the site of the former customs house. It was designed by Hack Kampmann. It was used in the rescue of the Danish Jews during World War II.

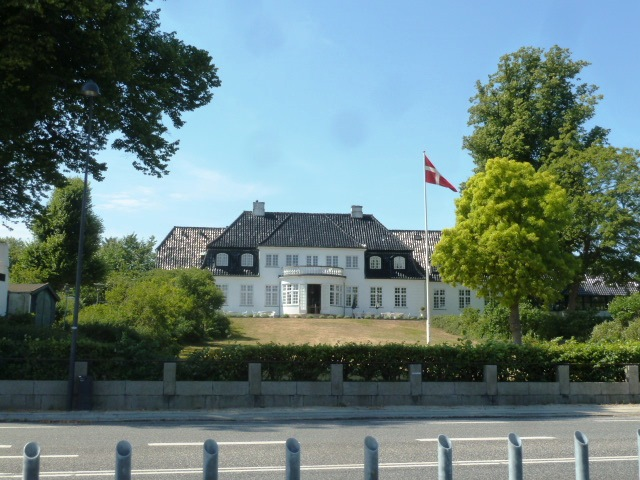
Bakkehuset

Bakkehuset was in 1811 purchased by bankier and ship owner Lauritz Nicolai Hvidt and served as summer residence for his family for more than a century. In 1915, the property was acquired by the affluent Stockbroker Johan Levin. He built the current house and established a large park of which only the mirror pond and a small lake with a Chinese bridge exist today. The house is now owned by Rudersdal Municipality and used as an activity centre for senior citizens.

Other notable houses in Vedbæk include Egebakken (Vedbæk Strandvej 335) and Strandbo (Vedbæk Strandvej 387A), both of which are listed.

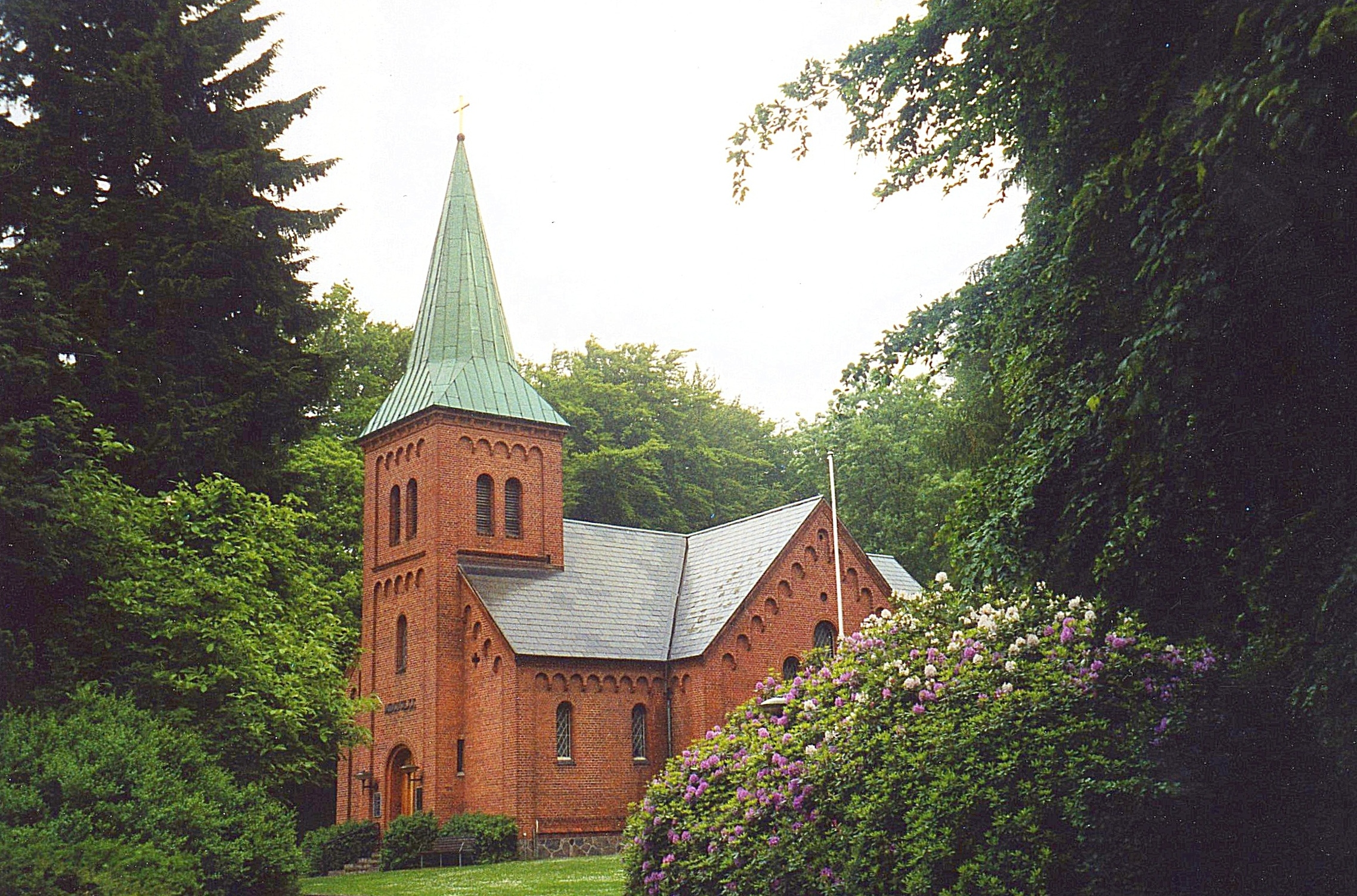
Vedbæk Church

=== Vedbæk Church ===
Vedbæk Church was built as a private chapel by the Hvidt family from Enrum and the Grøn family from Rolighed in Skodsborg. The historic building was designed by Vilhelm Tvede and completed in 1871. It has served as a parish church since 1923. In the 2020 Danish film Another Round (Danish: Druk), one scene is filmed at the church.

== Vedbæk Kulturhus ==
Vedbæk Kulturhus is a non-profit cultural and community center, which is run by volunteer enthusiasts and collaborates with local associations and businesses in Vedbæk. The cultural center offers a wide range of cultural activities.

The opportunity to establish a cultural center in Vedbæk arose when the historic station building in Vedbæk came up for rent in December 2022. After that, Vedbæk Kulturhus' board of directors was elected and the statutes were decided at the general meeting in February 2023 and the cultural center was established with the aim of creating the framework for community, cultural dissemination and strengthening social cohesion in Vedbæk, as well as creating a vibrant, strong and inclusive local community that is nice to live in.

== Parks and open spaces ==
Vedbæk North and South Beach is located at Vedbæk Marina and are the most popular beaches in Rudersdal Municipality. The North Beach comprises a sandy beach as well as a grassy area with scattered solitaire trees. The South Beach offers a purely natural setting with dunes and beach vegetation.

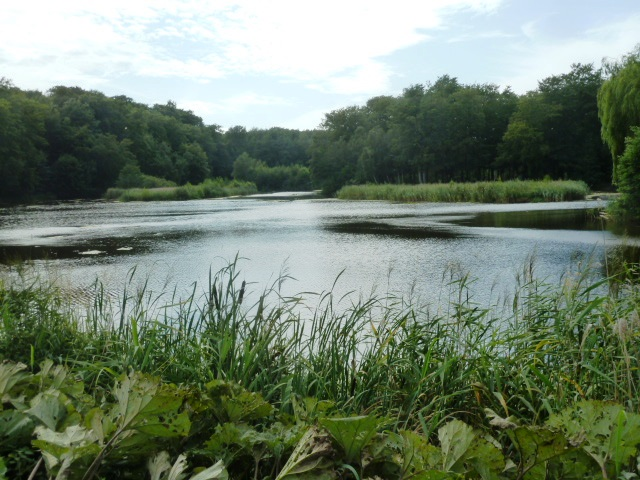
Enrum Pond

Enrum Forest has an area of 31 hectares. It adjoins Trørød Forest and is open to the public since it has been leased by the Danish Nature Agency on a 50 years contract. Its southern part is covered by a small lake, Enrum Pond (Enrum Dam), a boggy area and meadows. The rest is mainly beech forest. In the western part of the forest, in the central axis of the main building, stands the Friendship Column. In the northern part of the forest stands King Charles' Spring (Kong Carls Kilde), which supposedly catered to King Charles XII of Sweden during the departure of his troops from Vedbæk Harbour in 1700.

== Transport ==
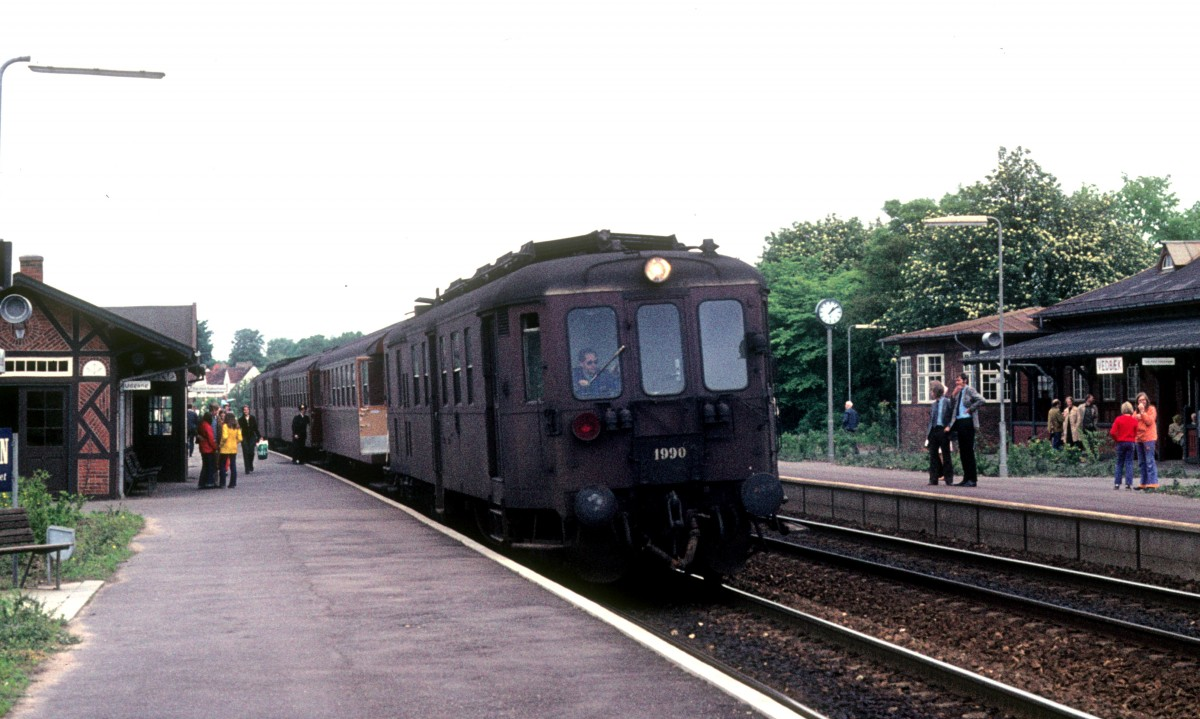
Vedbæk station

Vedbæk Station

Vedbæk Station is a Coast Line regional railway station, serving the Oresundtrain between Helsingør and Malmö. The station is like the other stations on the Coast Line designed by Heinrich Wenck in the National Romantic style.

Vedbæk was formerly also connected to Lyngby by rail. The Lyngby–Vedbæk Line was built mainly to serve the industrial enterprises along Mølleåen. It opened in 1900 but remained economically unsuccessful and the section from Nærum to Vedbæk closed on 1 January 1923. The railway was subsequently renamed the Nærum Line.

Movia bus lines linje 193, 195 and 388 serve Vedbæk.

== Notable people ==
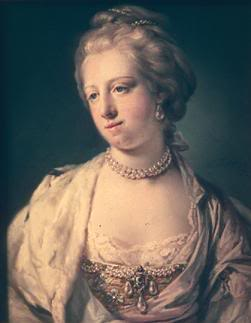
Princess Caroline Mathilde

=== Public Service & Public thinking ===
- Caroline Matilda of Great Britain (1751–1775) Queen consort of Denmark and Norway by marriage to King Christian VII. In 1771 the Court took summer residence at Hirschholm Palace where she planned a new summer villa, Frydenlund in Vedbæk
- Bodil Hellfach (1856–1941) pioneering Danish nurse, vice-chair of the Danish Nurses' Organization 1899–1907. Board member of DSR's recreational home in Vedbæk
- Ingeborg Hansen (1886 – 1954 in Vedbæk) Danish lawyer, elected Speaker of the Landsting in 1950, she was the world's first female Parliament speaker.
- Prince Joachim of Denmark (b. 1969), younger son of Queen Margrethe, and his wife Princess Marie reportedly bought a home at Vedbaek in 2023.

=== The Arts ===
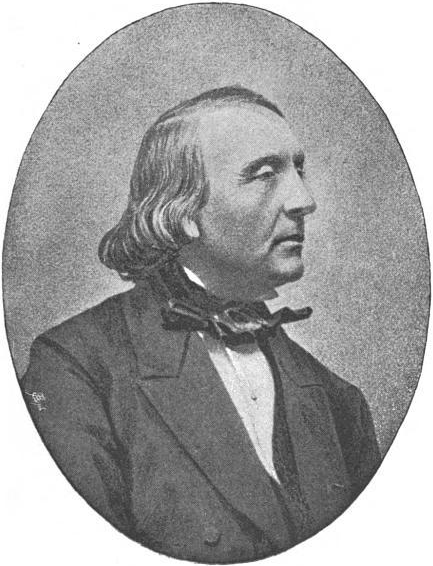
Andreas Munch

- Andreas Munch (1811 – 1884 in Vedbæk) Norwegian poet, novelist, playwright and newspaper editor, the first person to be granted a poet's pension by the Parliament of Norway
- Carl Baagøe (1829–1902) Danish marine painter, including Vedbæk, Seen from the Pier
- Georg Høeberg (1872 – 1950 in Vedbaek) Danish violinist, conductor and composer
- Aksel Andersen (1912 – 1977 in Vedbæk) American-born, Danish classical organist, composer and academic
- Bodil Kjer (1917 – 2003 in Vedbæk) Danish actress whose talent and charisma earned her status as a Primadonna and the title of first lady of Danish theater
- Kristor Brødsgaard (born 1979 in Vedbæk) Danish double bassist

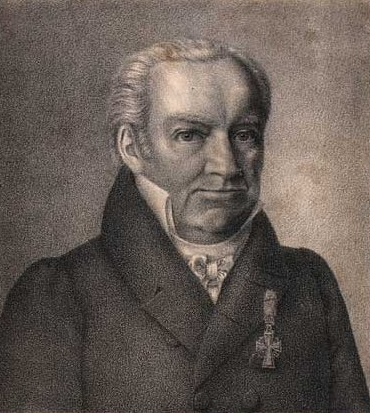
JD Herholdt, 1830

=== Architects & Business ===
- Ernst Brandenburger (1689 – 1713) Danish master builder and entrepreneur, from 1700 he owned a brickyard in Vedbæk
- Niels Sigfred Nebelong (1806–1871) Danish architect using the Historicist style, Copenhagen city architect from 1863, designed Sølyst Countryhouse, Vedbæk in 1847, redesigned in 1915.
- Johan Daniel Herholdt (1818–1902) an architect, royal building inspector, designed Enrum
- Gustav Bartholin Hagen (1873–1941) Danish architect, specializing in private villas and country houses, including Villa BH in Vedbæk (1904–08)
- Gudmund Nyeland Brandt (1878–1945) Danish landscape architect, works included Makiri, Villa Garden to Villa Nympha for Helge Jacobsen in Vedbæk (1930–31)
- Søren Skou (born 1964) CEO of Maersk Line since January 2012, lives in Vedbæk

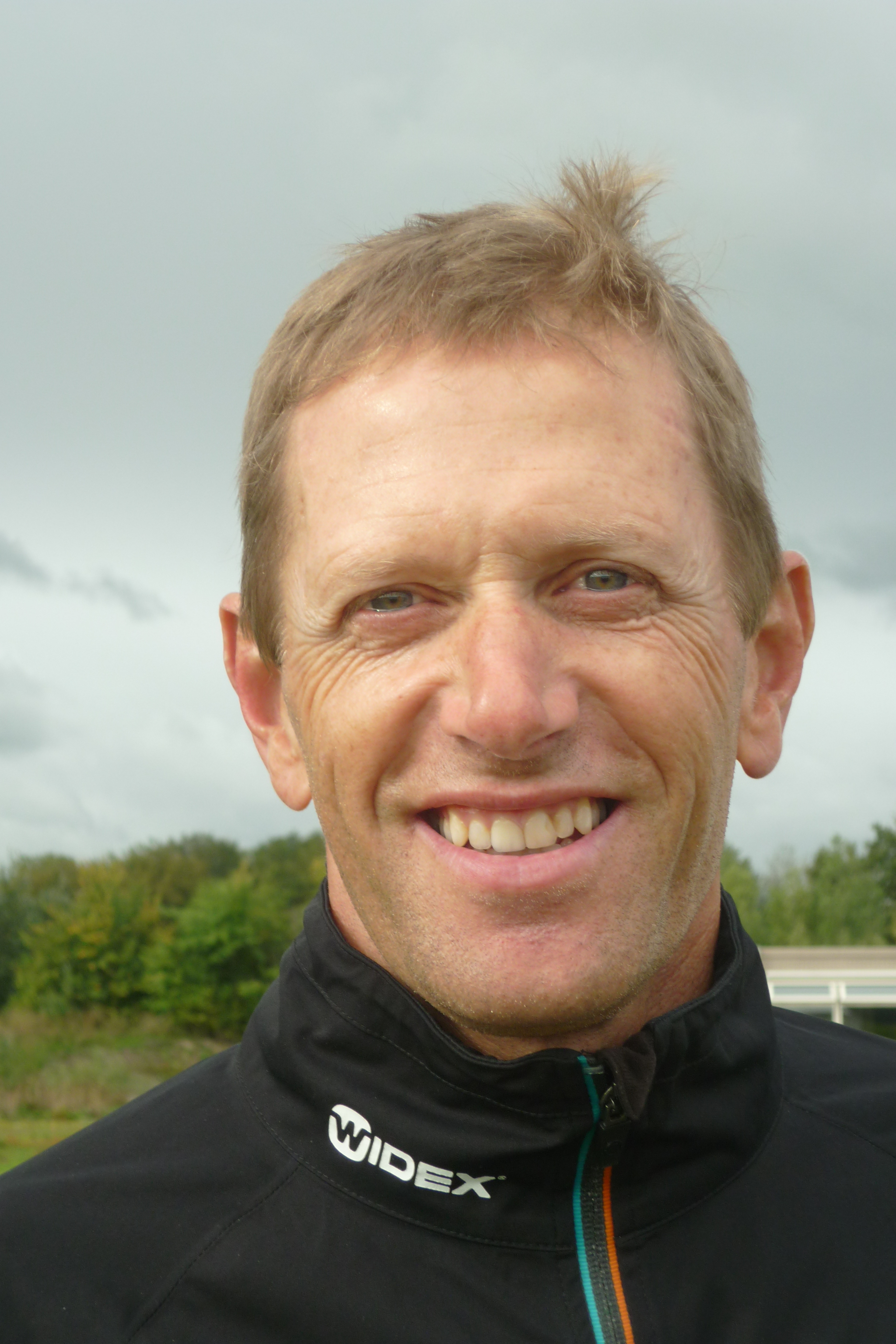
Steen Tinning, 2013

=== Sport ===
- Hans Andresen (1927 in Vedbæk – 2014) Danish cyclist, competed at the 1948 and 1952 Summer Olympics. He also rode in the 1958 Tour de France
- Steen Tinning (born 1962) professional golfer on the European Senior Tour, lives in Vedbæk.
- Martin Laursen (born 1977) Danish former footballer, settled in Vedbæk and worked as a football pundit for Sky Sports and as a co-commentator for Danish broadcaster TV2

== See also ==
- Strandridergaarden
- Bakkehuset (Vedbæk)

== Literature ==
- Petersen, Erik Brinch; (also contrib. Jønsson, J. H., Juel, C. and Kjær, A. (2015), Diversity of Mesolithic VEDBÆK. Acta Archaeologica, 86, #1.
- Stilling, Niels Peter: Miramare. Et stykke Danmarkshistorie ved Vedbækkysten (1992/ 2. udg. 1997)
- Stilling, Niels Peter: Vedbæk kirke (1996)
