= Listed buildings in Rudersdal Municipality =

This is a list of listed buildings in Rudersdal Municipality, Denmark.

== List ==
=== 2800 Kongens Lyngby ===
Listing name	Image	Location	Coordinates	Description
Raadvad		Raadvad 42, 2800 Kongens Lyngby		Stenhuggeribygning: Workshop from 1917.
Raadvad		Raadvad 42, 2800 Kongens Lyngby		
Raadvad		Raadvad 44, 2800 Kongens Lyngby		
Raadvad		Raadvad 46, 2800 Kongens Lyngby		
Raadvad		Raadvad 46, 2800 Kongens Lyngby		
Raadvad		Raadvad 48, 2800 Kongens Lyngby		
Raadvad		Raadvad 50, 2800 Kongens Lyngby		
Raadvad Hotel		Raadvad 52, 2800 Kongens Lyngby	1891	Taadvad Hotel is an inn from 1891. The façade was altered in c. 1914.

=== 2840 Holte ===
Listing name	Image	Location	Coordinates	Description
Attemosevej 53		Attemosevej 53, 2840 Holte	1970	House with cobbled surroundings, veranda, swimmingpool and pool house, designed by Gehrdt Bornebusch.
Carlsminde		Søllerødvej 30, 2840 Holte	c. 1750	Two-winged house from c. 1750.
Carlsminde		Søllerødvej 30, 2840 Holte	c. 1750	Two-winged house from c. 1750.
Dronninggårds Allé 42		Dronninggårds Alle 42, 2840 Holte	2965	House from 1954 designed by Jørn Utzon.
Fogedgården		Søllerødvej 36, 2840 Holte		Fogedgården consists of two detached buildings located on each their side of a yard: A half-timbered residential wing from 1838-49to the south and a former stable wing in rendered brick from c. 1850 on the road (north).
Fogedgården		Søllerødvej 36, 2840 Holte		
Fredensdal		Kildevej 8, 2840 Holte	1824	Fredensdal is a thratched house from 1824. located on the north side of Søllerød Lake. The listing also comprises a guesthouse (1924), the garden and a grotto.
Fredensdal		Kildevej 8, 2840 Holte	1824	Fredensdal is a thratched house from 1824. located on the north side of Søllerød Lake. The listing also comprises a guesthouse (1924), the garden and a grotto.
Frederikslund		Frederikslundsvej 21, 2840 Holte	c. 1804	House from c. 1804 designed by Joseph-Jacques Ramée.
Gammel Holtegård		Attemosevej 170, 2840 Holte	1756	Country house from 1756 designed by Lauritz de Thurah.
Gammel Dronninggårds Allé 3 og 6: Gate pillars		Gl.Dronninggrd.Alle 3, 2840 Holte		Former Dronninggård gate pillar from the 1780s.
Gammel Dronninggårds Allé 3 og 6: Gate pillars		Gl.Dronninggrd.Alle 7, 2840 Holte		Former Dronninggård gate pillar from the 1780s.
Mothsgård		Søllerødvej 23-25, 2840 Holte		Three-winged house from the 18th century, now a local history museum.
Mothsgård		Søllerødvej 23-25, 2840 Holte		Three-winged house from the 18th century, now a local history museum.
Næsseslottet		Dronninggårds Alle 124-140, 2840 Holte		Country house from 1783 by Andreas Kirkerup as well as various other buildingsm walls and monuments in the park.
Næsseslottet		Dronninggårds Alle 124-140, 2840 Holte		
Næsseslottet		Dronninggårds Alle 124-140, 2840 Holte		
Næsseslottet		Dronninggårds Alle 124-140, 2840 Holte		
Næsseslottet		Dronninggårds Alle 124-140, 2840 Holte		
Næsseslottet		Dronninggårds Alle 124-140, 2840 Holte		
Næsseslottet		Dronninggårds Alle 124-140, 2840 Holte		
Næsseslottet		Dronninggårds Alle 124-140, 2840 Holte		
Næsseslottet		Dronninggårds Alle 124-140, 2840 Holte		
Næsseslottet		Dronninggårds Alle 124-140, 2840 Holte		
Olufshøj		Søllerødvej 40, 2840 Holte		Two-winged house from the second half of the 18th century, including the gate on Søllerødvej.
Rudersdal Town Hall		Øverødvej 2, 2840 Holte		Town hall with park and immediate surroundings from 1942 by Arne Jacobsen and Flemming Lassen.
Rudersdal Town Hall		Øverødvej 2, 2840 Holte		Annex building to the east from 1967 by Arne Jacobsen and Flemming Lassen.
Søllerød Kro		Søllerødvej 35, 2840 Holte	1788	Inn from 1677.
Søllerød Rectory		Søllerødvej 31, 2840 Holte	1788	Three-winged rectory and stables building to the north c, 17944.
Søllerød Rectory		Søllerødvej 31, 2840 Holte	1788	Three-winged rectory and stables building to the north c, 17944.
Villa Kathus		Norske Alle 15, 2840 Holte	1968	House with surroundings from 1968 designed by Bertel Udsen.

=== 2850 Nærum ===
Listing name	Image	Location	Year built	Description
De Ovale Haver (20)		K-F Nærum Og Omegn 1, 2850 Nærum	1952	Allotments from 1948-52 designed by Carl Theodor Sørensen.

=== 2942 Skodsborg ===
Listing name	Image	Location	Coordinates	Description
Countess Danner's Mansion		Skodsborg Strandvej 113, 2942 Skodsborg	1852	House from 1852 designed by Peter Kornerup, now part of Skodsborg Spa Hotel, and the grotto in the park.
Skodsborg station		Bøllemosevej 4, 2942 Skodsborg	1897	station buildings on both sides of the tracks from 1897 designed by Heinrich Wenck.
Skodsborg station		Bøllemosevej 4, 2942 Skodsborg	1897	station buildings on both sides of the tracks from 1897 designed by Heinrich Wenck.
Skodsborg station		Bøllemosevej 4, 2942 Skodsborg	1897	station buildings on both sides of the tracks from 1897 designed by Heinrich Wenck.
Skodsborg station		Bøllemosevej 4, 2942 Skodsborg	1897	station buildings on both sides of the tracks from 1897 designed by Heinrich Wenck.
Skodsborg station		Bøllemosevej 4, 2942 Skodsborg	1897	station buildings on both sides of the tracks from 1897 designed by Heinrich Wenck.
Villa Rex		Skodsborg Strandvej 123, 2942 Skodsborg	1858	House from 1969 designed by Johan Henrik Nebelong (tower added in 1880) for King Frederick VII and Countess Danner, now part of Skodsborg Spa Hotel.

=== 2950 Vedbæk ===
Listing name	Image	Location	Coordinates	Description
Egebakken		Vedbæk Strandvej 335, 2950 Vedbæk	1861	House, stables and tool house from 1861, veranda added in 1860-
Egebakken		Vedbæk Strandvej 335, 2950 Vedbæk	1861	House, stables and tool house from 1861, veranda added in 1860.
Egebakken		Vedbæk Strandvej 335, 2950 Vedbæk	1861	House, stables and tool house from 1861, veranda added in 1860.
Enrum		Vedbæk Strandvej 341, 2950 Vedbæk	1952	House from 1864 designed by Johan Daniel Herholdt and King Charles' Spring.
Enrum		Vedbæk Strandvej 341, 2950 Vedbæk	1952	House from 1864 designed by Johan Daniel Herholdt and King Charles' Spring.
Frydenlund		Frydenlunds Alle 9, 2950 Vedbæk	1756	House from 1795.
Frydenlund		Frydenlunds Alle 9, 2950 Vedbæk	1756	House from 1795.
Frydenlund		Frydenlunds Alle 9, 2950 Vedbæk	1756	House from 1795.
Frydenlund		Frydenlunds Alle 9, 2950 Vedbæk	1756	House from 1795.
Frydenlund		Frydenlunds Alle 9, 2950 Vedbæk	1756	House from 1795.
De to tidl. portørboliger ved Vedbæk Station		Baneskellet 64, 2950 Vedbæk		House, stables and tool house from 1861, veranda added in 1860-
De to tidl. portørboliger ved Vedbæk Station		Baneskellet 64, 2950 Vedbæk		House, stables and tool house from 1861, veranda added in 1860-
De to tidl. portørboliger ved Vedbæk Station		Baneskellet 64, 2950 Vedbæk		House, stables and tool house from 1861, veranda added in 1860-
De to tidl. portørboliger ved Vedbæk Station		Baneskellet 64, 2950 Vedbæk		House, stables and tool house from 1861, veranda added in 1860-
De to tidl. portørboliger ved Vedbæk Station		Baneskellet 64, 2950 Vedbæk		House, stables and tool house from 1861, veranda added in 1860-
De to tidl. portørboliger ved Vedbæk Station		Baneskellet 64, 2950 Vedbæk		House, stables and tool house from 1861, veranda added in 1860-
De to tidl. portørboliger ved Vedbæk Station		Baneskellet 64, 2950 Vedbæk		House, stables and tool house from 1861, veranda added in 1860-
De to tidl. portørboliger ved Vedbæk Station		Baneskellet 64, 2950 Vedbæk		House, stables and tool house from 1861, veranda added in 1860-
Strandbo		Vedbæk Strandvej 387A, 2950 Vedbæk		Strandby is a nine-bay house whose northern end (give bays) date from c. 1835 while its southern end (four bays) fate from c. 1860. A detached shed to the rear dates from c. 1880.
Strandbo		Vedbæk Strandvej 387A, 2950 Vedbæk		Strandby is a nine-bay house whose northern end (give bays) date from c. 1835 while its southern end (four bays) fate from c. 1860. A detached shed to the rear dates from c. 1880.
Vedbæk station		Vedbæk Stationsvej 20A and C, 2950 Vedbæk	1897	Station building, staircase building and platform tunnel from 1897 by Heinrich Wenck.
