= Hegnsholt =

Country house at Grønholt, Denmark

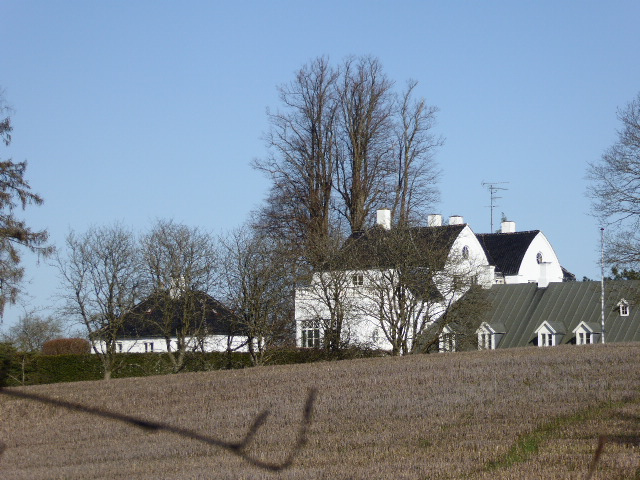
- The main building seen from Grønholt Hegn

General information
- Location: Fredensborg, Denmark, Denmark
- Coordinates: 55°56′18.2″N 12°22′44″E
- Completed: 1815 = 103+
- Client: Adam Wilhelm Hauch
- Owner: Niels Fennet

Design and construction
- Architect: Christian Frederik Hansen / Louis Hygom

Hegnsholt is a country house an estate located at Grønholt, between Fredensborg and Hillerød, North Zealand, some 40 km north of Copenhagen, Denmark. The first main building on the estate was built in 1815 to designs by Christian Frederik Hansen but it was extended in 1904 and adapted by the architect Louis Hygom in 1920 for the businessman William Bendix. The estate is now owned by Cabinn Hotels-owner Niels Fennet. The adjacent Grønholt Airfield was built on part of the land in 1940.

== History ==
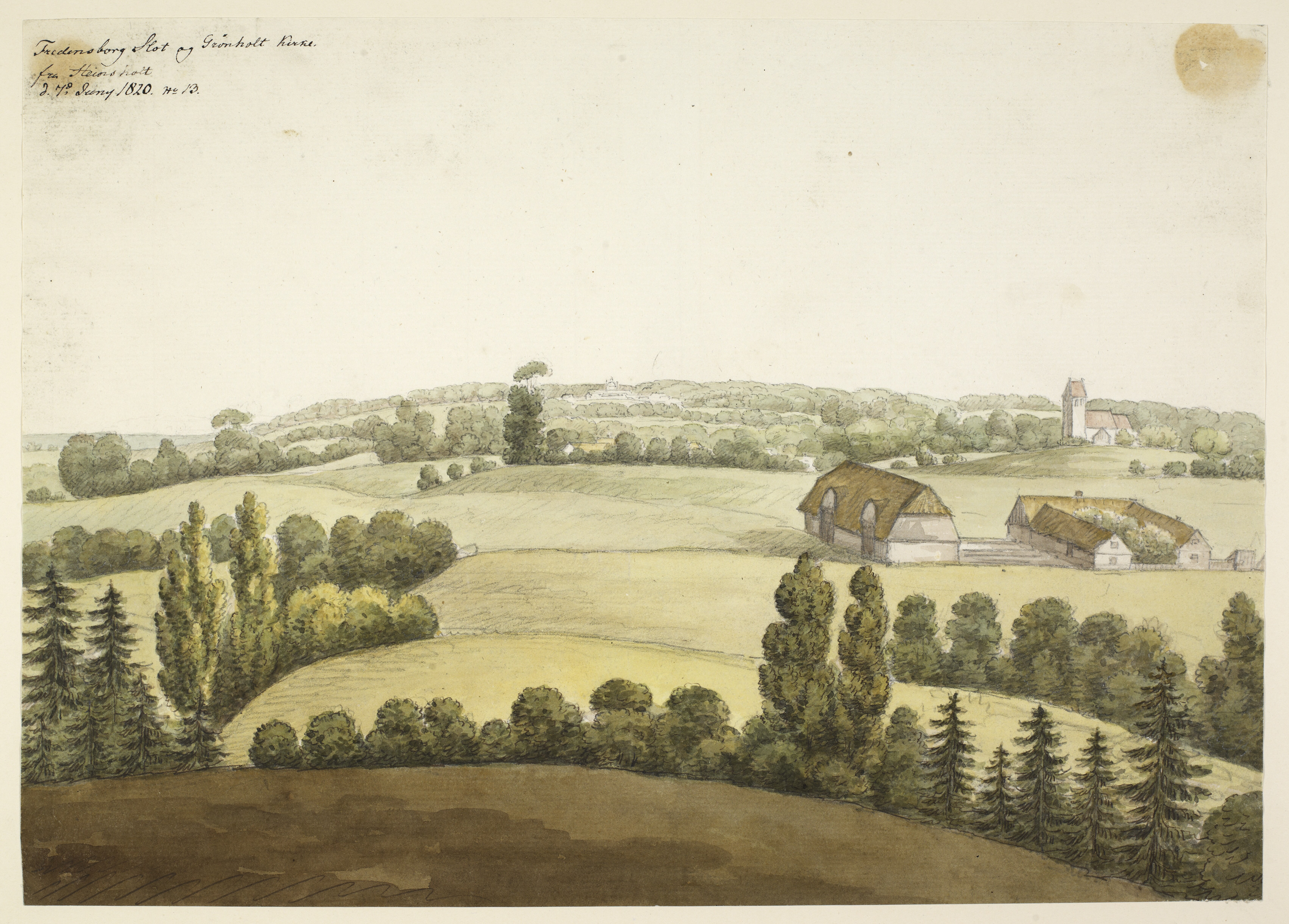
Ole Jørgen Rawert: Hegnsholt with Grønholt Church and Fredensborg Palace in the background, / June 1820

The land at the site was purchased by lord chamberlain Adam Wilhelm Hauch in 1812. He commissioned the architect Christian Frederik Hansen to design a country house for his new estate.

The estate was in 1828 sold to justitsråd Heinrich Callesen who later that same year sold it to Copenhagen-based merchant Christian Ludvig Lütken (born 1801).

Hegnsholt was in 1832 acquired by Georg Peter Ludvig Zacharia (1792-1870). He had served as a customs officer in the Danish West Indies but later settled as a merchant in Copenhagen. He was the father of military officer and geodesist Georg Zachariae and the grandfather of Francis Zachariae. He sold the estate to Georg Flemming Windersleff in 1832 and would later purchase Sophienberg and Nygård at Kongens Lyngby.

The estate changed hands many times over the next decades.

In 1881, Hegnsholt was acquired by Gustav Grüner (1839-1928). He managed Hegnsholt and Vandsbæk in a partnership with his son Thor Grüner He expanded Hauch's main building in 1894. Grüner was a major landowner. His holdings comprised Eliselund at Kolding, Dronninggaard and Frederikslund at Holte, Kidrup Gaard at Ringsted, Sæbygaard at Tissøand Haunsø Møllegård /mill and inn)

Hegnsholt was in 1916 sold to the engineer and politician Villars. Lunn. He had recently sold Aggersvold at Holbæk.

Hegnsholt was in 1919 sold to William Bendix, one of the owners of Brødrene Bendix, a leading Danish importer of agricultural machines based at Gammeltorv. He adapted the main building the following year with the assistance of the architect Louis Hygom. He kept the estate until his death in 1937.

Christian Bohnstedt-Petersen purchased Hegnsholt for DKK 120,000 in 1937. Christian Bohnstedt-Petersen (1894-1967) was a pioneer in Danish aviation. He had obtained the 50th Danish pilot certificate in 1918 and was a manufacturer of both bicycles, motorcycles, automobiles and aircraft. He manufactured 52 Taylor/Piper for the Danish market on a license in the 1930s. He established a 400 m by 400 m airfield on the estate in 1940. A sealed runway was constructed in 1956.

Hegnsholt was after Christian Bohnstedt-Petersen's death passed to his son Peter Bohnstedt-Petersen (1940-2002). He was just 18 years old when he obtained his pilot certificate after training under Morian Hansen.

== List of owners ==
- (1912-1828) Adam Vilhelm von Hauc
- (1828-) Heinrich Callesen
- (1828-1733) Christian Ludvig Lütke
- (1933-1842) Georg Peter Ludvig Zacharia
- (1842-1850) Georg Flemming Windersleff
- (1950-1852) Carl Theodor Lindbach
- (1852-) Frederich Sommer
- () Ida Charlotte Amalie Sommer
- (1859) Jacob Ludvig Jørgensen
- (1859-1860) H. P. Rygaard
- (1860-) N. B. Krarup
- (1866-1877) Gutzou Jacob Erik Jeronimus Münster
- (1877-1881) Wilhelm Lars Larsen Krag
- (1881) Emilie Krag
- (1881-1916) Gustav Elias Grüner
- (1916-1919) Villars. Lunn
- (1919-1937) William Bendix
- (1937-1958) Christian Bohnstedt-Petersen
- (1958-1984) Bohnstedt-Petersen A/S
- (1984-1995) Peter Bohnstedt-Petersen
- (1995-present) Niels Fennet
