= Frederikslund =

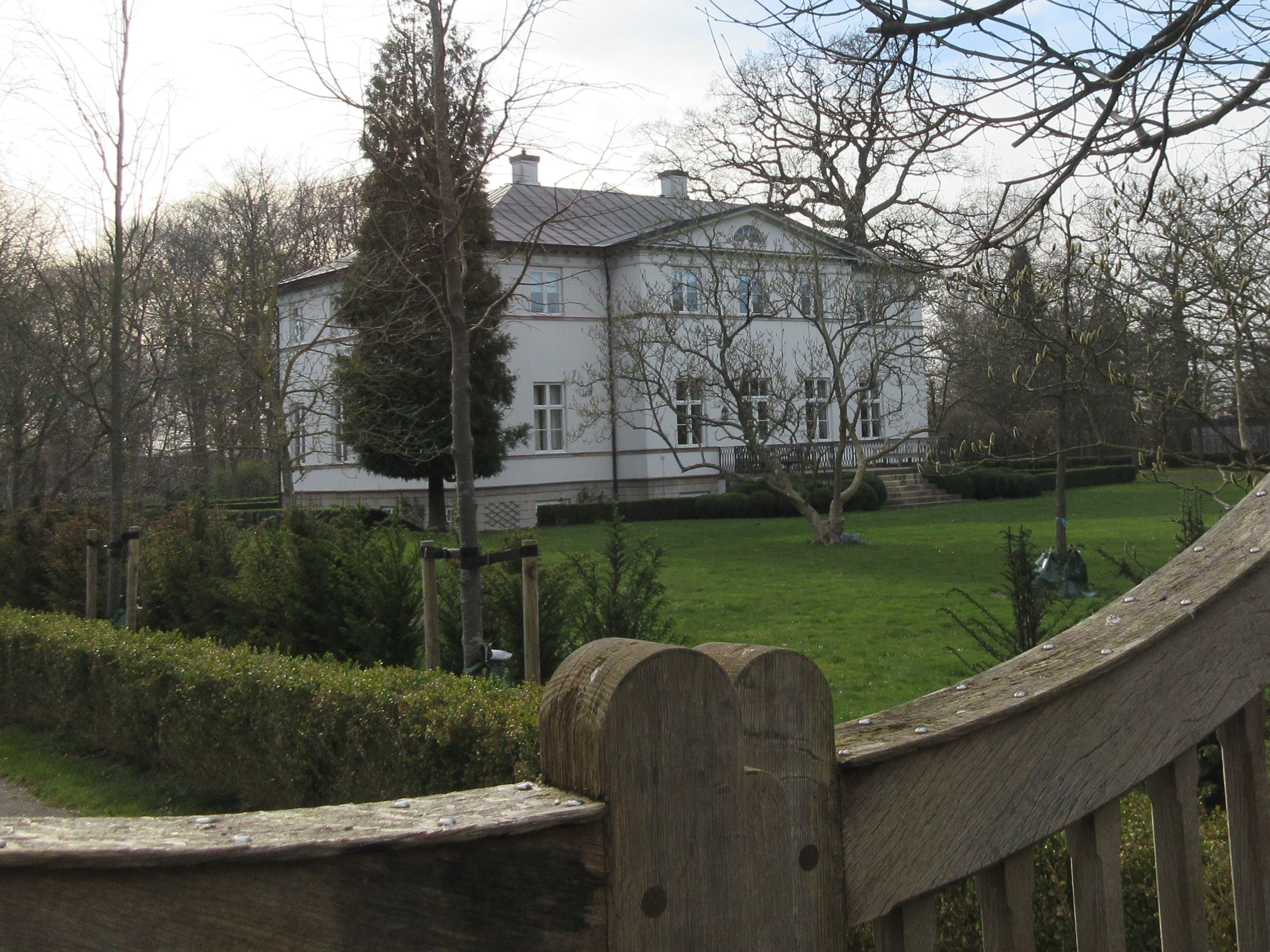
- Frederikslund in 2020
- Interactive map of the Frederikslund area

General information
- Location: Holte, Rudersdal Municipality, Denmark
- Coordinates: 55°48′48.13″N 12°27′48.2″E
- Completed: 1802
- Renovated: 1804
- Client: Frédéric de Coninck

Design and construction
- Architect: Joseph-Jacques Ramée

Frederikslund is a former country house now located in the middle of a neighbourhood of single-family detached homes at Frederikslundsvej 21 in Holte, Rudersdal Municipality. some 20 km north of central Copenhagen, Denmark. The building was completed in 1803 to a Neoclassical design by Joseph-Jacques Ramée. It was listed in the Danish registry of protected buildings and places in 1978.

Frederikslund Skov, a small woodland between Furesø and the Hillerød rail line, takes its name after the property..

== History ==
=== de Coninck family ===
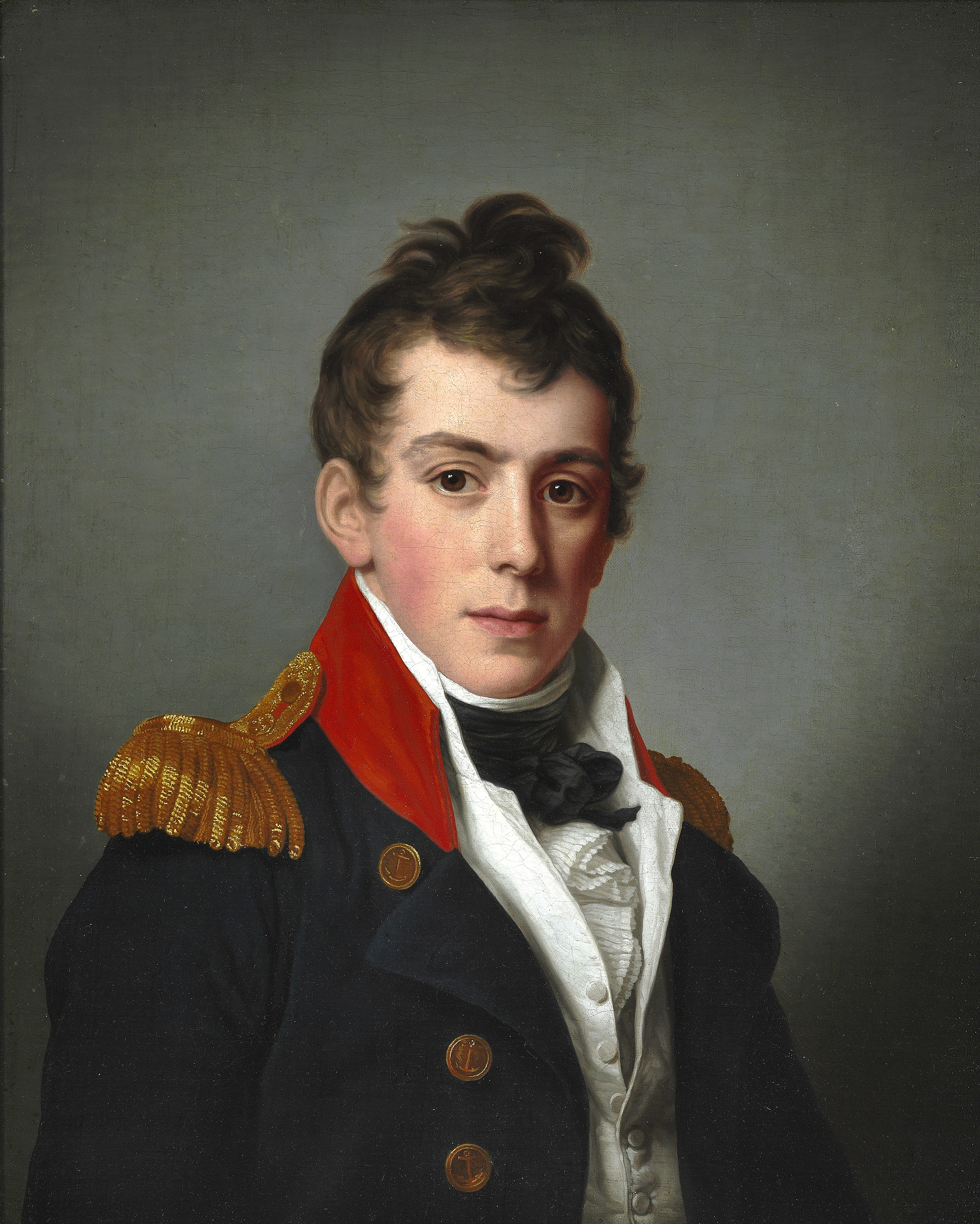
Louis Charles Frédéric de Coninck

The vast Dronninggård estate was from 1781 owned by merchant and ship-owner Frédéric de Coninck. His eldest son, Louis Charles Frédéric de Coninck (1779-1852), a naval officer, was in 1802 married to Henriëtte Madelaine Eschauzier[1]. In connection with the wedding, Frédéric de Coninck charged the Hamburg-based French architect Joseph-Jacques Ramée with the design of a suitable summer residence for the young couple on a site situated approximately 500 metres to the east of his own country house. It was completed in 1804 and given the name Frederikslund (Frederik's Grove).

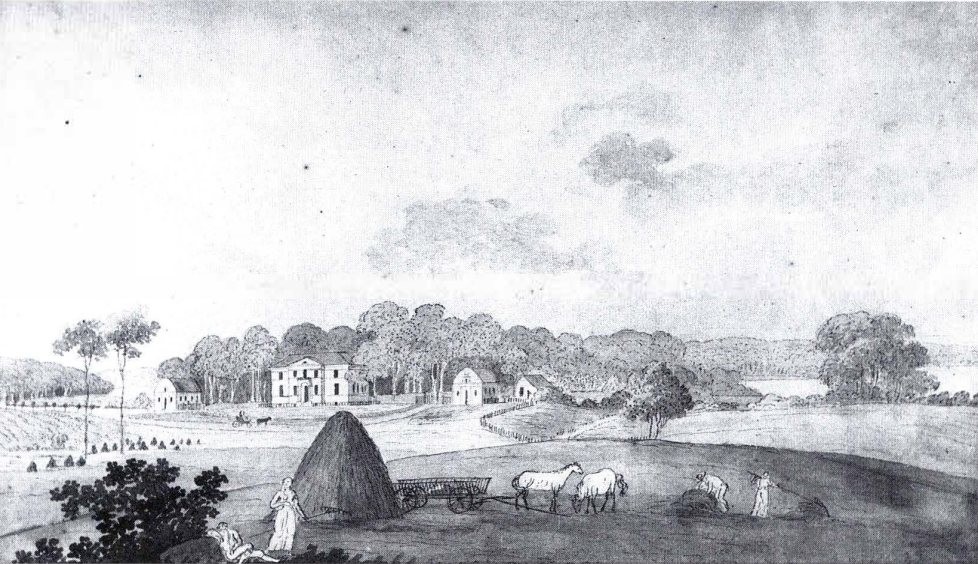
Frederikslund seen on a watercolour by Søren Læssøe Lange, 1820.

Louis Charles Frédéric de Coninck's city home was a 13-room apartment in the De Coninck House in Copenhagen. Shortly prior to his father's death in 1811, he became the owner of both the property in Copenhagen and the Dronninggård estate.

=== Changing owners ===
The de Coninck family's trading house went bankrupt in 1822. Together with Dronninggaard, Frederikslund was subsequently sold to Hamburg-based J. M. Jenisch. Dronninggård changed hands several times over the next few decades.

=== Redevelopment and new functions ===
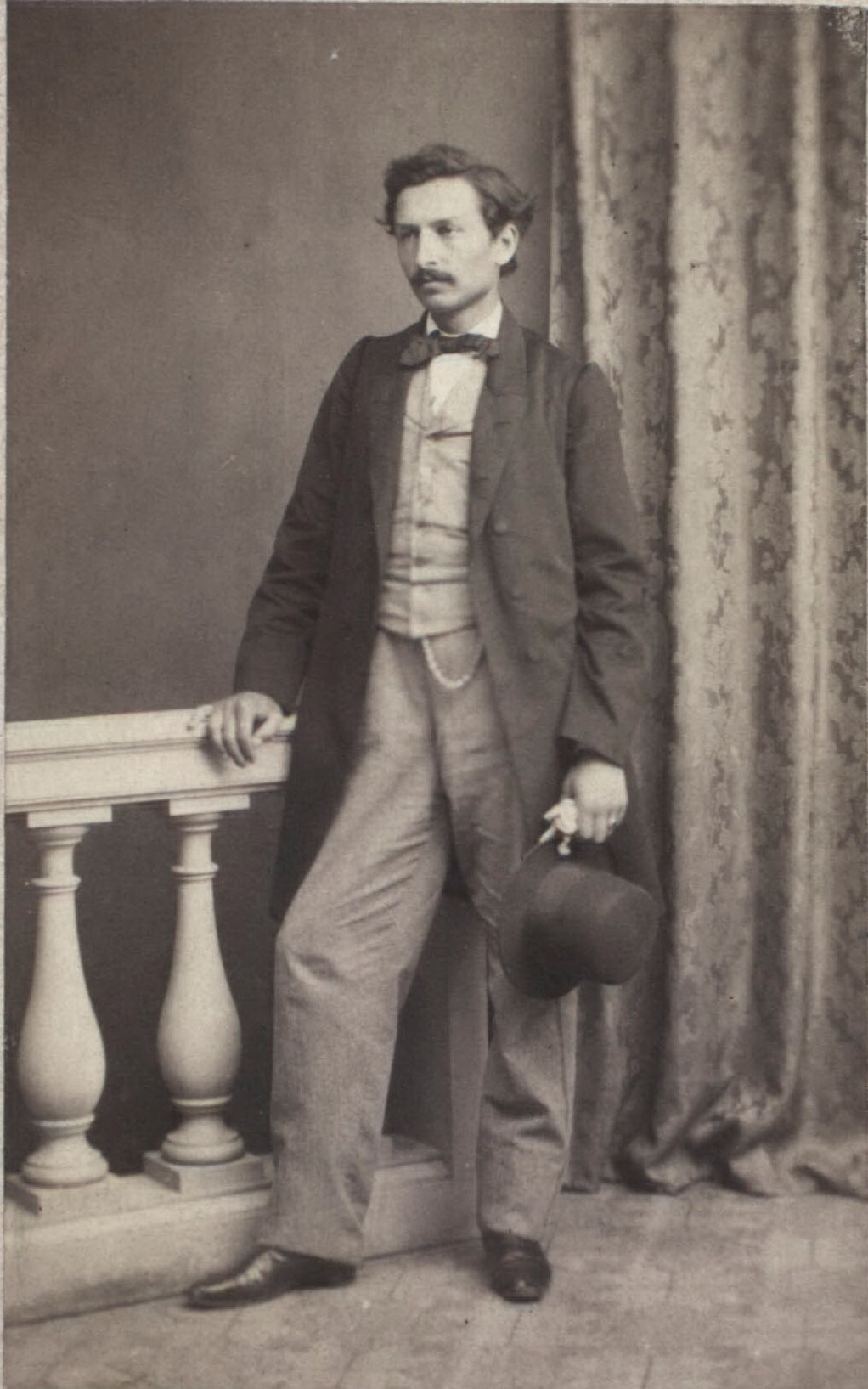
Gustav Elias Grüner

In 1895, Dronninggaard was acquired by a consortium. Frederikslund was the following year sold to Gustav Elias Grüner while Frederikslund's former home farm at Dronnionggårs Allé was at the same event sold to master carpenter C.A. Tesch. The land that belonged to both properties was over the next years sold off in lots and used for single-family detached homes. Grüner was a major landowner and real estate speculant. His other holdings included Hegnsholt at Fredensborg, Eliselund at Kolding, Kærup at Ringsted, Sæbygaard, at Høng Tissøand at Tissø and Haunsø Møllegård (mill and inn) He owned Frederikslund until 1916. Grúnersvej is named after him.

The house has later been used both as a boarding school and an orphanage for girls. It was listed in the Danish registry of protected buildings and places in 1978.

== Architecture ==
Frederikslund consists of two storeys over a raised cellar. The facade features an open loggia with sandstone columns. The garden facade features a median risalit toååed by a triangular pediment. The modillioned cornice is decorated with small, circular blindings.

== Today ==
The house was in 1991 converted into a private residence.

== See also ==
- Sophienholm
