= Olufshøj =

Building in Rudersdal Municipality, Denmark

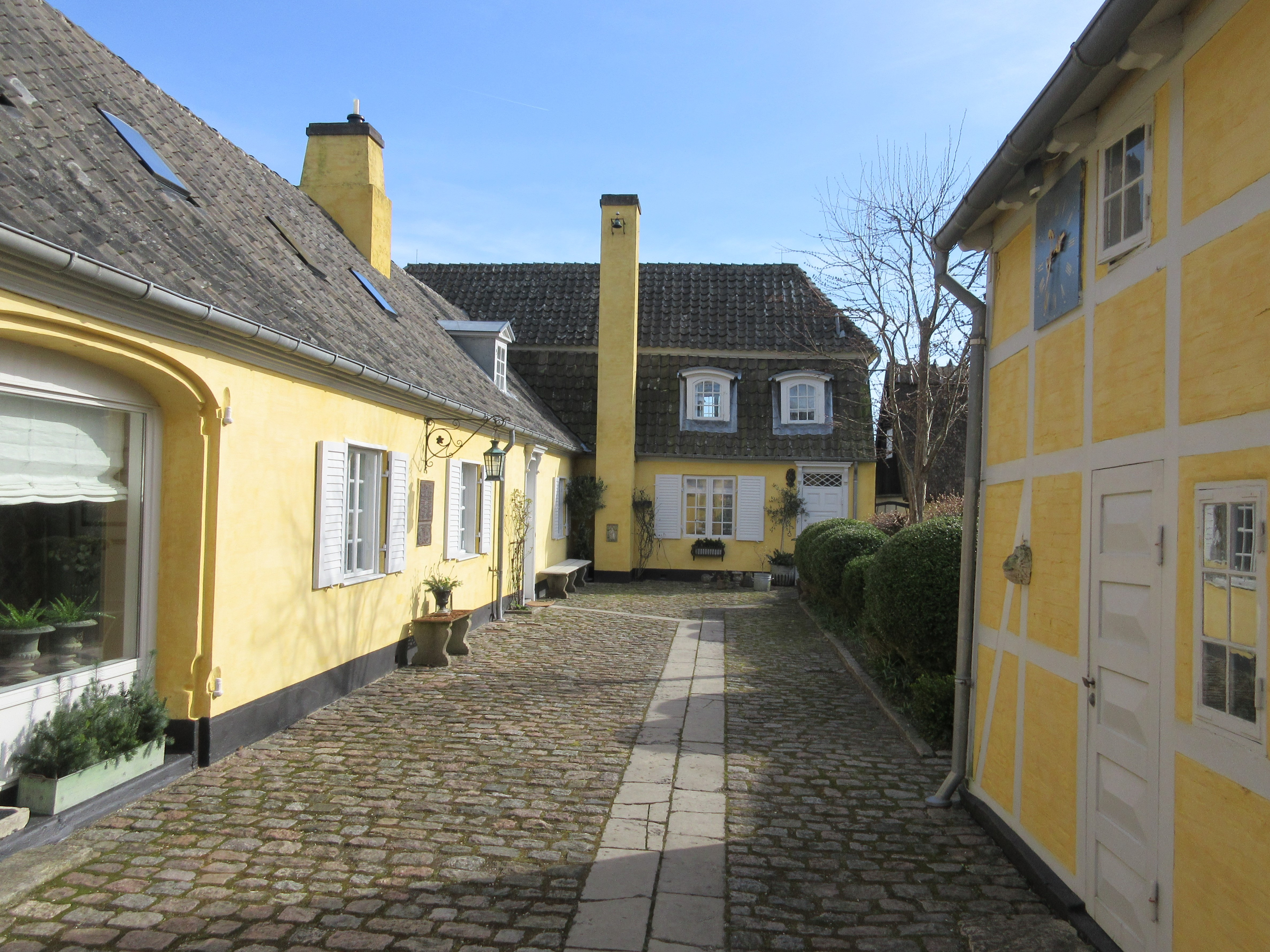
- Interactive map of the Olufshøj area

General information
- Location: Søllerød, Rudersdal Municipality, Søllerødvej 40, 2840 Holte, Denmark
- Coordinates: 55°48′47.99″N 12°29′46.5″E
- Completed: 18th century

Design and construction
- Architect: Povl Baumann

Olufshøj is an 18th-century country house in Søllerød, Rudersdal Municipality, some 20 km north of Copenhagen, Denmark. It was listed on the Danish register of protected building and places in 1918.

== History ==
=== Origins ===
The property belonged to Marie Wittmack from at least 1749. It was later passed to her son-in-law Jacob Stendrup. He served as principal of Vartov Hospital. In 1788, Stendrup sold the estate to Major-General J. Zeuthen Lemming. In 1805. it belonged to one etatsrådinde Rehsted.

=== Olsen/Neergaard family ===
The property belonged to one etatsrådinde Rehsted in 1805. It was not long thereafter sold to chief auditor (overauditør) Ulrich Christian Olsen. His daughter Louise was born in November 1808. She was baptized in Søllerød Church on 22 June 1809. Ulrich Christian Olsen died in 1814. The couintry house was subsequently acquired by two of his nephews. On 23 August 1830, Louise Olsen was married to amtmand Johan Ferdinand de Neergaard. Some time later, the country house was acquired by Lord President in Copenhagen Michael Lange.

Some time after Louise de Neergaard (née Olsen) had become a widow in 1849, probably in c. 1852, she reacquired the country house in Søllerød. Louise de Meergaard's city home was at Amaliegade 7.

Louise Neergaard was a personal friend of the writer Hans Christian Andersen. He would often visit her for dinner on Saturdays in her apartment in Amaliegade. In July 1874, Andersen visited her at Olufshøj. He completed the first leg of the journey by train to Holte. The new North Line to Helsingør had opened just one month earlier. In Holte, Neergaard had arranged for a carriage to pick him up by a carriage. Andersen was quite depressed because of the war with Prussia during the visit. He also suffers from toothache.

After Louise de Neergaard's death in 1875, it passed to her youngest daughter Marie de Neergaard.

=== Jersild family ===
In 1916, Olufshøj was acquired by chief physician Olaf Jersild. He spent his summers in the house with his wife Ingeborg Ellen Margrethe Jersild and their four children. He renamed it Olufshøj (Oluf's Mound, Oluf = Olaf). Olaf and Ingeborg Jersild died in 1950 and 1951. Olufshøj was then taken over by their second eldest son, Peter Mogens Jersild, another chief physician. He spent the summers there with his wife Marie Louise (née Kønigsfeldt) and three daughters. The house was later taken over by his daughter Kirsten and her husband Ture.
