= Niels Fennet =

Danish engineer and businessman

Niels Fennet (born 20 July 1944) is a Danish engineer and businessman best known for founding the low-cost hotel chain Cabinn. He is also the owner of the historic inn Store Kro in Fredensborg.

== Early life and career ==
Fennet was born on 20 July 1944 in Valby in North Zealand but grew up with his mother in the Vesterbro district of Copenhagen after his parents divorced. His mother was a teacher and later became the principal of several primary schools. Fennet studied engineering and opened his own engineering consultancy at age 24. The company grew to have 45 employees.

== Founding of the Cabinn chain ==
In the late 1980s, Fennet conceived the idea for the CABINN chain and decided to use his experience with cost-efficient construction projects in a new venture and sold his company to the employees in 1989. His first hotel opened in Copenhagen in 1990.

== Other investments ==
Fennet also owns a portfolio of other properties.

In 2013, Fennet purchased the historic inn Store Kro situated next to Fredensborg Palace in Fredensborg.

== Personal life ==
Niels Fennet lives with his wife Lise Fennet on the Hegnsholt estate at Fredensborg north of Copenhagen. They have three daughters.
