= Fredensdal =

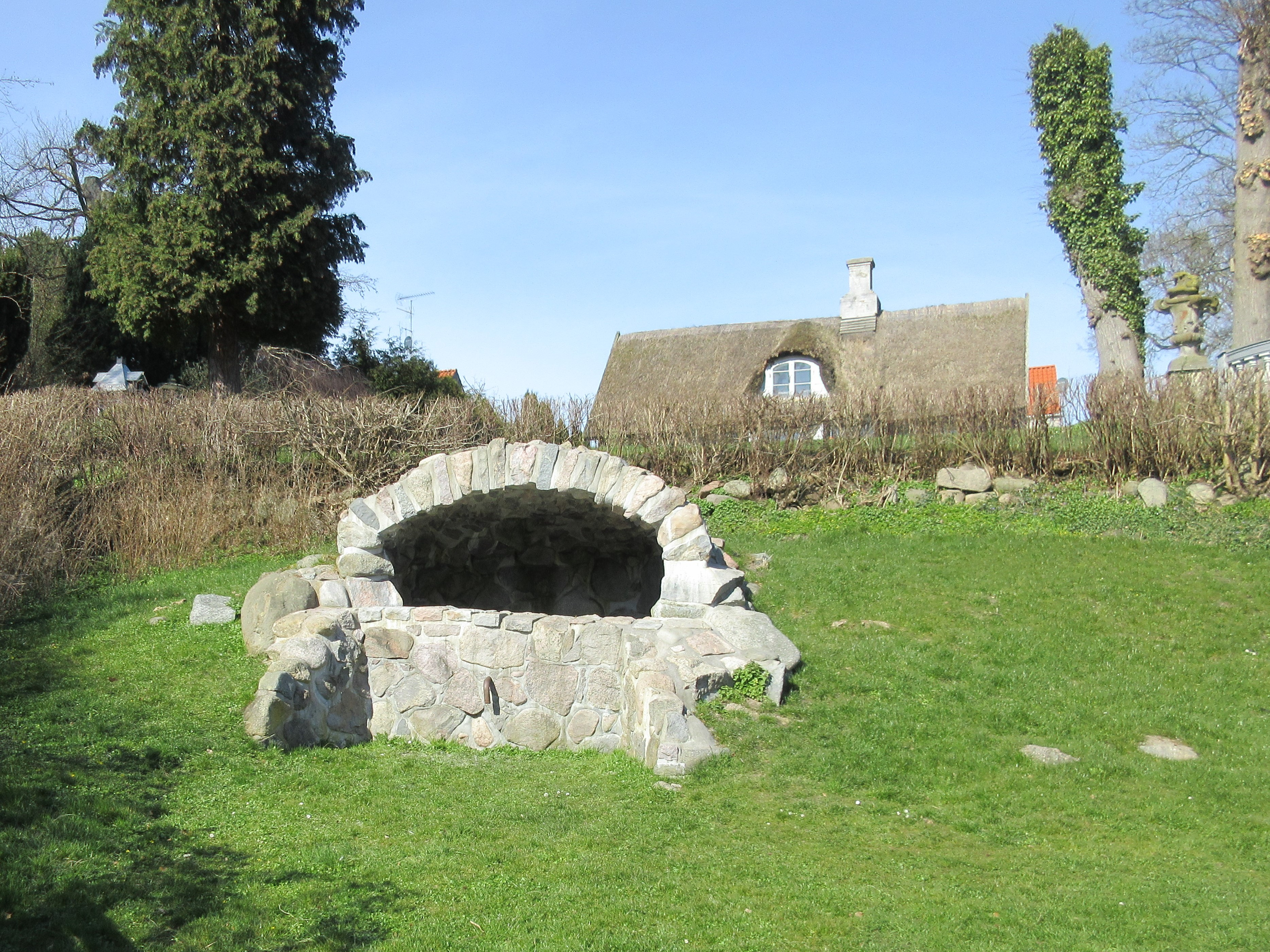
- Fredensdal in 2020
- Interactive map of the Fredensdal area

General information
- Location: Kildevej 8, Holte, Denmark
- Coordinates: 55°48′57.53″N 12°29′12.88″E
- Renovated: 1824
- Cost: Rudersdal Municipality

Fredensdal is a former country house now located in a suburban setting on the sloping north side of Søllerød Lake in Øverød, Rudersdal Municipality, some 20 km north of central Copenhagen, Denmark. On the lakeside below the house is a small public greenspace with a grotto built over a spring known as Suhms Kilde (Suhm's Spring).

The house and a detached guesthouse were both listed in the Danish registry of protected buildings and places in 1983. The garden design from the 1960s and Suhm's Spring are also included in the heritage listing.

== History ==
On the 18th and early 19th century, many of the farms and smallholdings in the village of Øverød were converted into summer residences for wealthy people from Copenhagen. Fredensdal was built for a controller ( Kgl. Møntguardien) at the Royal Mint named Fabritius in 1824. It was originally known as Nøjsomhed ("Frugality").

Nøsjomhed was later owned by the English brothers John and Thomas Christian Naylor.

The bookdealer Aughust Bang owned Fredensdal from 1771 to 1920.

== Garden ==
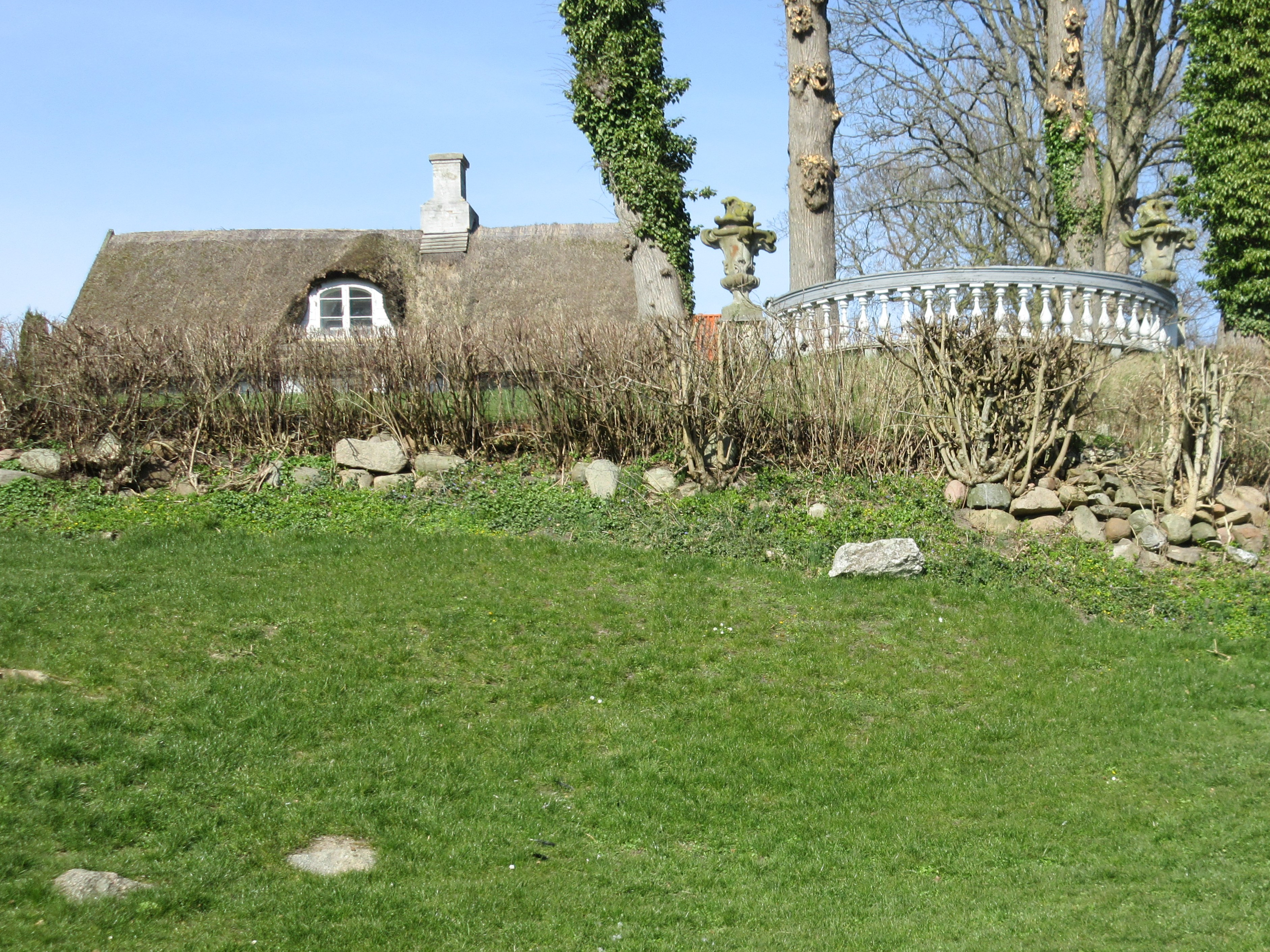
The house and balustrade seen from the lakeside

The garden was redesigned by Professor Christian Elling and his wife, the sculptor Gertrud Sadolin Elling, during their ownership in the 1960s. It includes a balustrade lined with elm trees and stone vases from the demolished Hirschholm Palace in Hørsholm.

== Architecture ==
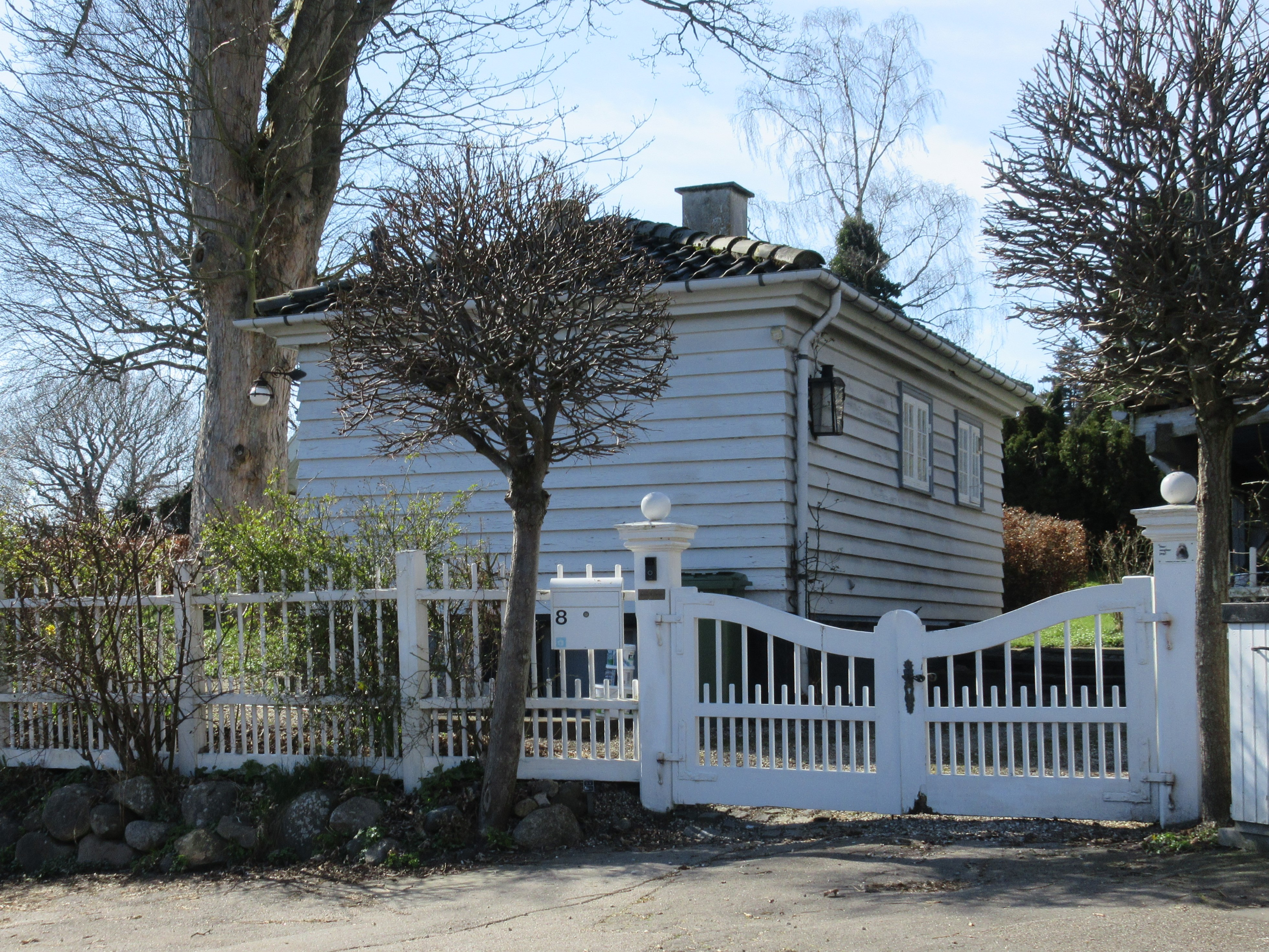
The guesthouse

Fredensdal has a thatched roof with carved bargeboards and walls with horizontal board siding painted in a pale grey colour. The plinth, corner lesenes, window frames and doors are painted in a darker grey colour. The roof is pierced by a brick chimney and a thatched dormer on each side.

The guesthouse has a modestly pitched ]hip roof with black-glazed tiles and walls with overlapping board siding.

The main building and guesthouse were both listed in the Danish registry of protected buildings and places in 1983. Both buildings were modernized in 2005–06.

== Suhm's Spring ==
Suhm's Spring was historically the only source of clean drinking water for the residents of Øverød and was even used by villagers from Søllerød on the other side of the lake who did not have their own well until a public well was finally dug at a site next to the village pond in 1867.

The spring takes its name after the historian Peter Frederik Suhm (1728-1798). He owned the property Suhmsminde in Øverød, where he established a fishing pond as well as an extensive fruit garden. The house was located just north of Bystævnet but was demolished in 1959.

== See also ==
- Cottage orné
