= Carlsminde =

Baroque-style mansion in Søllerød, Denmark

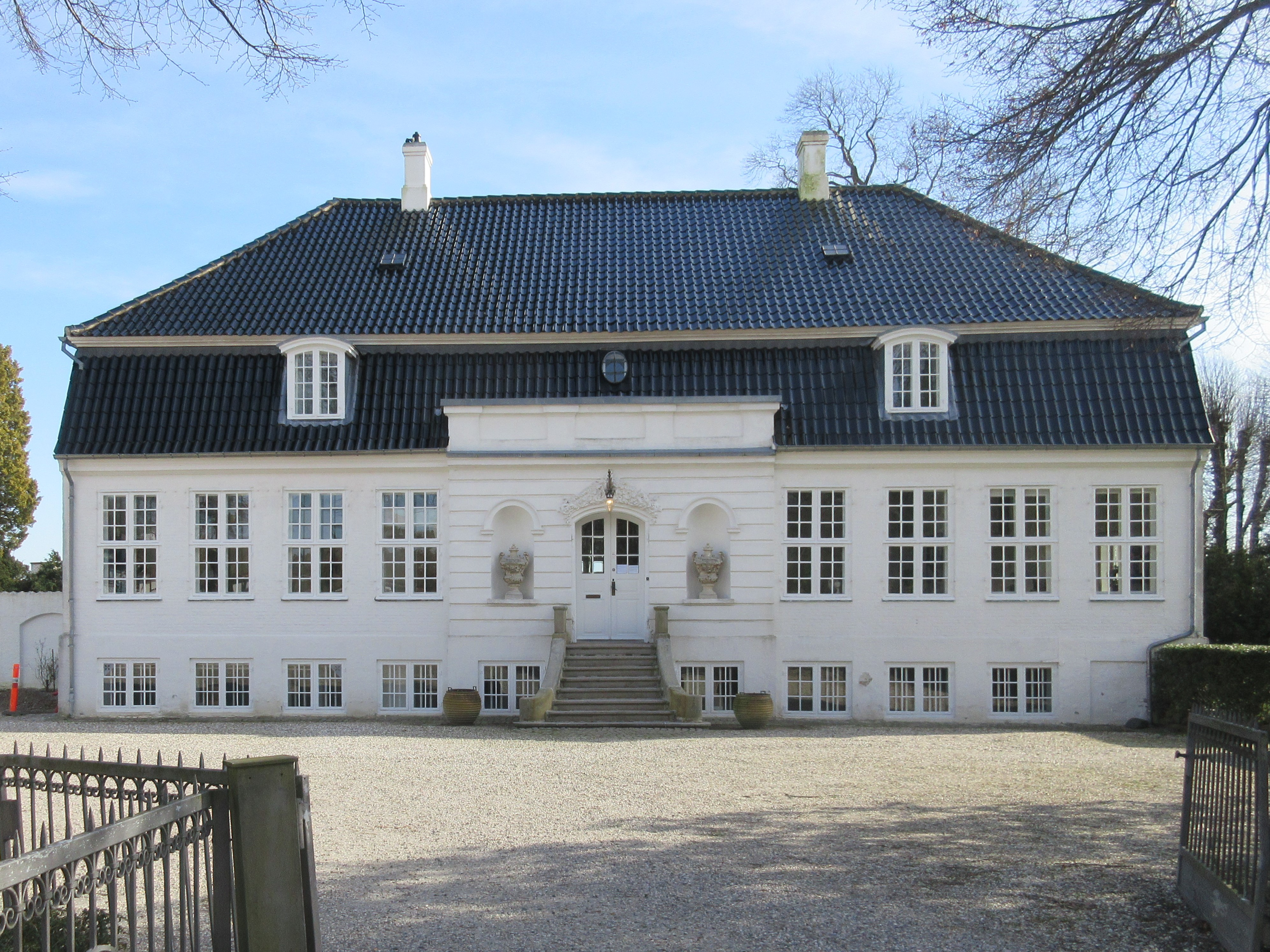
- Interactive map of the Carlsminde area

General information
- Architectural style: Baroque
- Location: Søllerød, Rudersdal Municipality, Denmark
- Coordinates: 55°48′45.13″N 12°29′41.2″E
- Completed: c. 1780
- Owner: Venstre

Carlsminde is a Baroque-style mansion located at Søllerødvej 30 in Søllerød, Rudersdal Municipality, some 20 kilometres north of central Copenhagen, Denmark. The building was listed on the Danish registry of protected buildings and places in 1918. The political party Venstre has been based in the building since 1971 and is currently for sale.

== History ==
=== 18th century ===
Carlsminde originates in an old tenant farm. Court physician and kancelliråd Johan Peter Homuth constructed a small country house on the land in 1751 and later expanded the estate with more land twice. The current building was built for a later owner, Peter Wasserfalls, a grocer and manufacturer, probably a few years prior to his death in 1782. Wasserfall left the estate to his son who also purchased another nearby property.

=== 19th century ===
Christian Ditlev Frederik Reventlow, a landowner and the country's prime minister, who wanted a summer residence close to Copenhagen, purchased the estate in 1799.

In 1804, Bolette Rudolphine Berg (1761–1836) purchased the estate. She gave it its current name in memory of her late husband Carl Berg. She also completed a 3.5-hectare (8.6-acre) park in the English landscape style.

From 1855 to 1867, Carlsminde was owned by hunting master Rasmus Petersen. During this period Carlsminde changed status from tenant farm to ownership. The house was then owned by composer Emil Hartmann. A later owner, Valet de chambre G. F. Bentzen, changed the facade in 1894.

=== 20th century ===
In 1903, Carlsminde was acquired by bank manager Isak Glückstadt. He expanded the estate from 10 to 25 hectares. The park was expanded by the landscape architect Erstad Jørgensen . It was centred on a lake with pikes and tenches and was also home to two Indian elephants. In 1907 Glückstadt commissioned Carl Brummer to build a Norwegian-style cabin. It was moved to Rungsted in 1910 and to Holte in the early 1940s.

Dethlef Jürgensen owned Carlsminde from 1913 to 1947. He sold off most of the land, creating the streets Carlsmindevej and Carlsmindeparken. Jürgensen was a central figure at Klampenborg Racecourses. In 1913 he constructed the side wing with stables for nine horses.

A later owner, Erik Møller, a CEO, established a riding ground to the rear of the stables in the 1950s. Venstre acquired the property in 1970 and has been based there since 1971.

On 19 March 2023, Venstre announced their intention to sell Carlsminde in order to get new ones closer to Copenhagen.

== Architecture ==
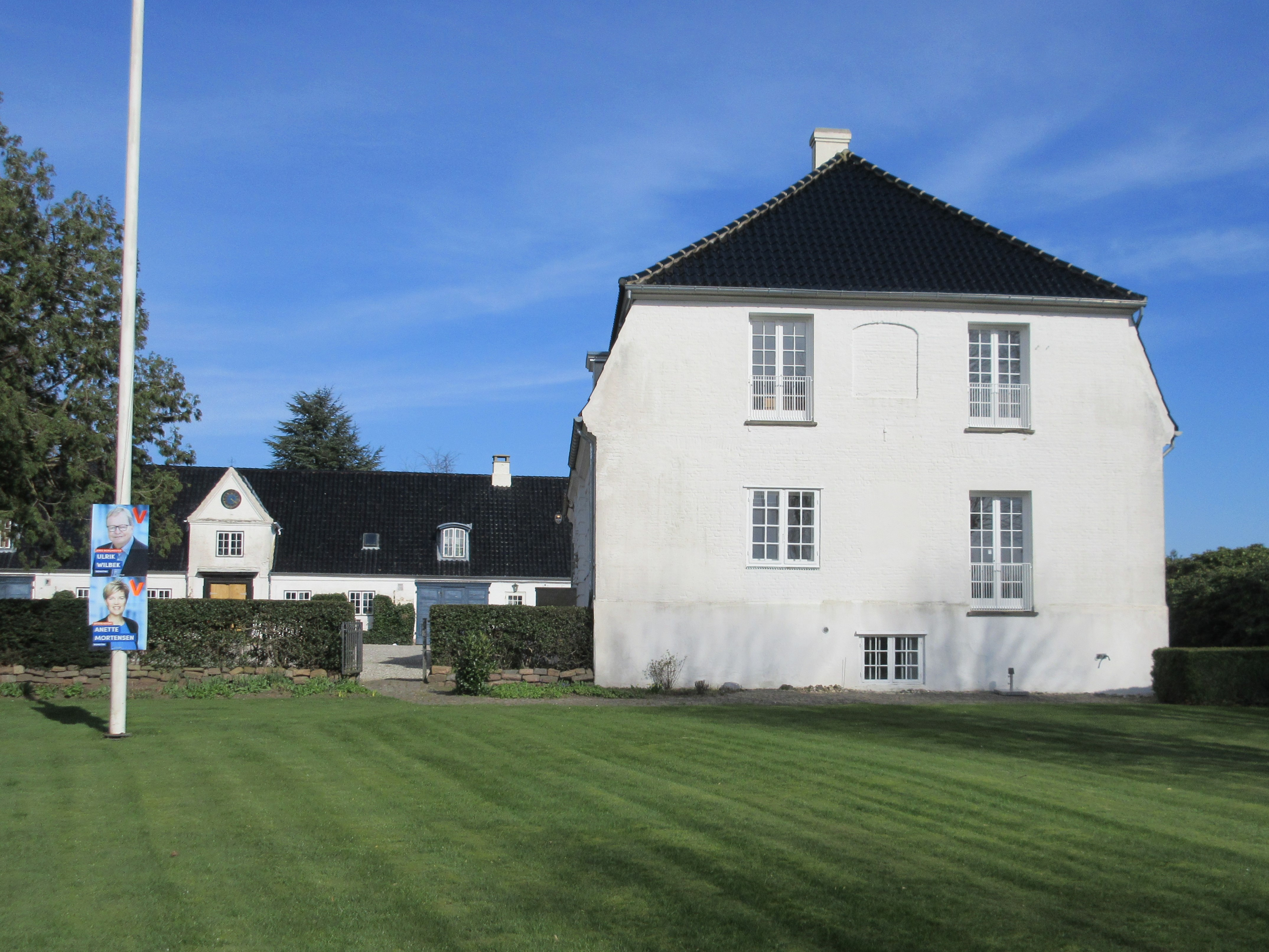
The building seen from the garden

The main building fronts a large courtyard located on the southside of Søllerødsvej. A detached side wing marks the east side of the courtyard.

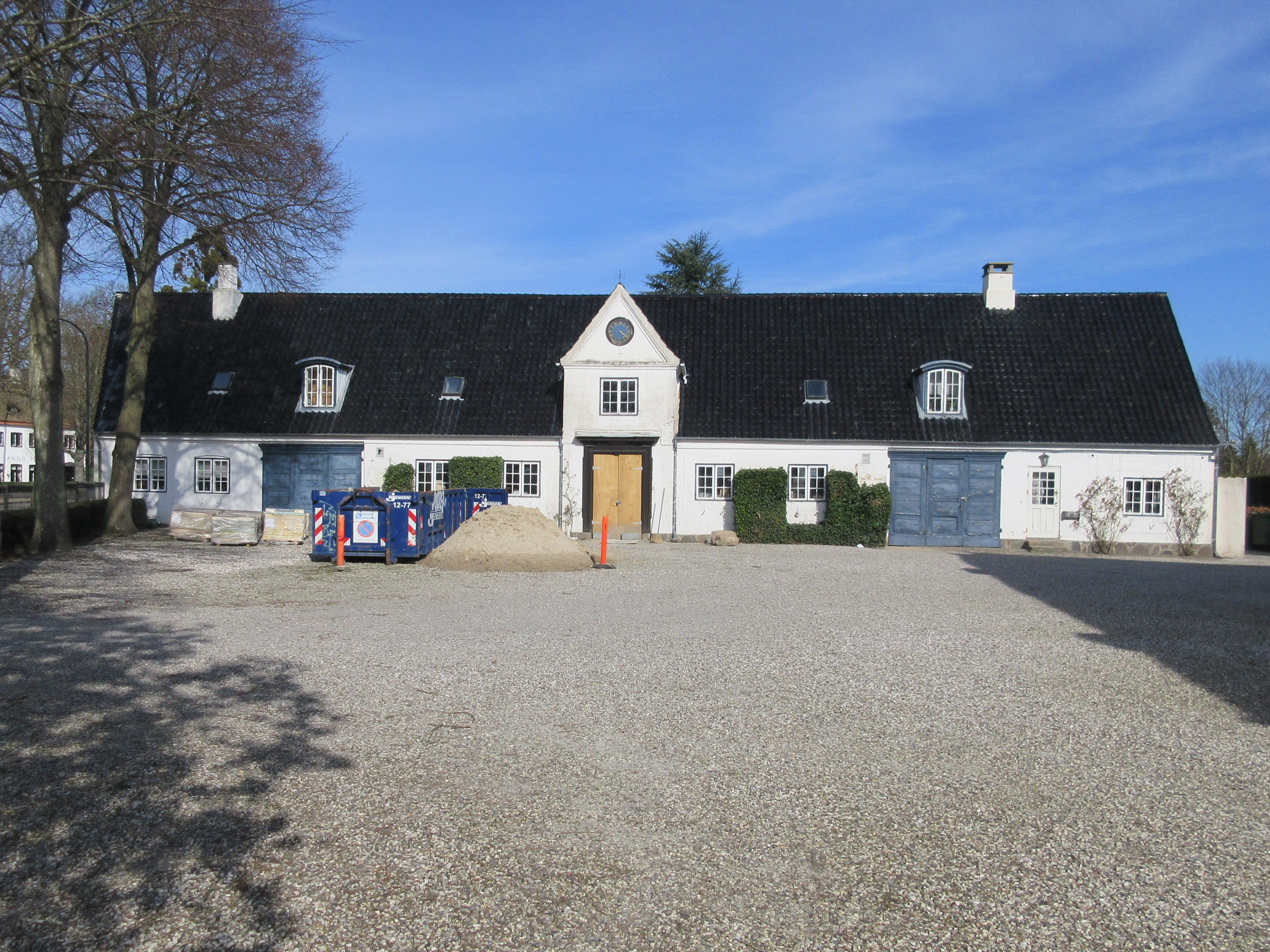
The side wing

The main building is 11 bays long and consists of a high cellar, bel étage and a hipped Mansard roof with blue-glazed tiles. The three-bay median risalit was adapted in the 1893. The two windows that flanked the main entrance were replaced by niches with sandstone vases. The Rococo-style Cartouche above the main entrance and the Neclassical attica was also added at this point. The combination of decorative elements from different architectural styles is a characteristic feature of the Historicist style that dominated Danish architecture in the 1890s.

The side wing contains two small apartments flanking a stable with room for nine horses. The northern gable of the side wing is integrated in the wall that partly surrounds the property.

== Today ==
The secretariat of Venstre is based in the building. The garden is used for events on Constitution Day (5 June).

== List of owners ==
- (1751-?) Johan Peter Homuth
- (?-1782) Peter Wasserfalls
- (1688-1804) Christian Ditlev Frederik Reventlow
- (1804-1828) Bolette Rudolphine Berg
- (1828-1855) Theodor Land
- (1855-1867) Rasmus Petersen
- (1867-)Ju l. Chr. Dideriksen
- (-) Nicholai chierbeck
- () Hans Schierbeck
- (-1872-1873) G. L. Jørgensen
- (1872) Oscar Em il van Deurs
- (1873-1874) G. H. Hagemann
- (1874-1881) Emil Hartmann
- (1881-1903) Georg Emil Bentzen
- (1903-1910) Isak Glückstadt
- (1910-1913) Emil Glückstadt
- (1913-1947) Dethlef Jürgensen
- (1950-erne)Erik Møller
- (1959-1970) Høsjsteretssagfør Gerda Schiørring, née Riis
- (1970-) Partiet Venstre
