= Cabinn Hotels =

Danish low-cost hotel chain

- Type: Private
- Industry: Hotel
- Founded: 1990
- Founder: Niels Fennet
- Headquarters: Denmark
- Number of locations: 8 hotels
- Key people: Niels Fennet(CEO)
- Website: www.cabinn.com

CABINN Hotels is a Danish low-cost hotel chain with eight hotels in the five largest cities in Denmark: four in Copenhagen, one in Aarhus, one in Odense, one in Aalborg and one in Esbjerg. CABINN Hotels is owned by the entrepreneur Niels Fennet.

== History ==
CABINN Hotels was founded in 1990 by Niels Fennet, who was inspired by the practical cabins he and his family stayed in on a tour to Norway. He found that the cabin contained everything needed for a stay, and that its functionality made it possible to have it all in a small space. This concept he transferred to the hotel business.

== Rooms ==
CABINN Hotels have four room categories to accommodate price levels. Economy is the cheapest and smallest room; Standard is the most common room and a little bigger. The two last categories, Commodore and Captains are the most expensive.

== Hotels ==
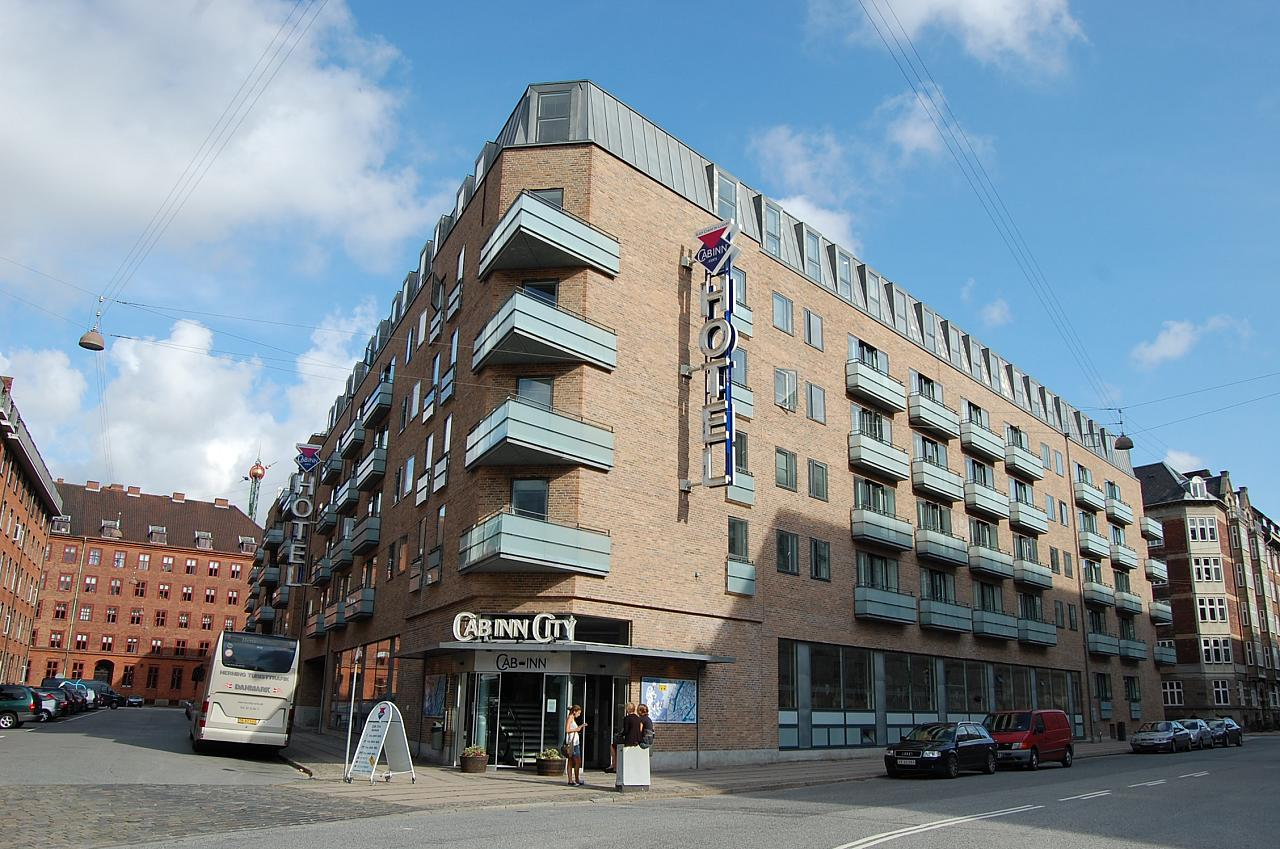
CABINN City

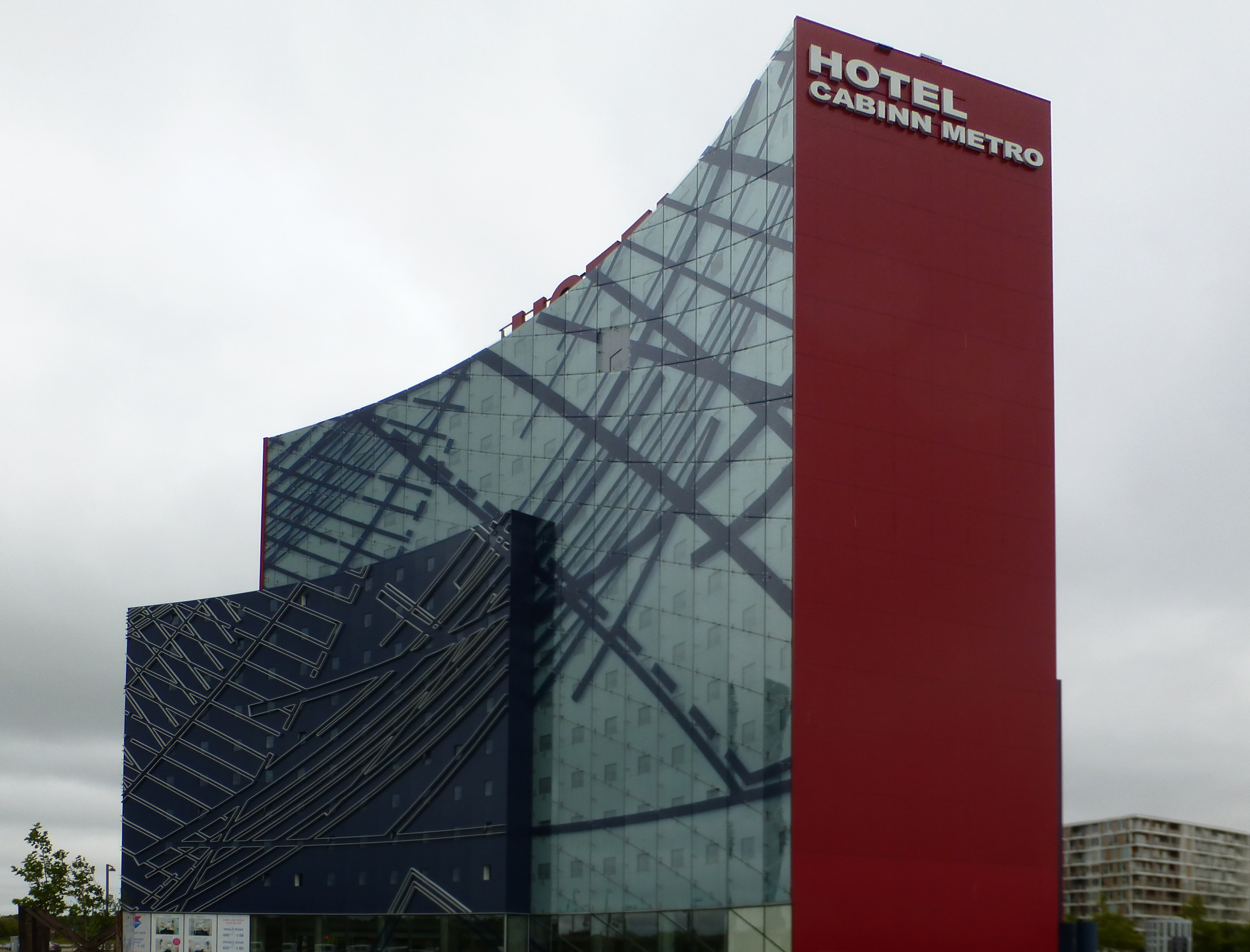
CABINN Metro Copenhagen

=== CABINN Express ===
CABINN Express is the first hotel to be built in the CABINN chain in 1990 in Copenhagen. CABINN Express is the smallest of all the CABINNs with 86 rooms and 260 beds. It is located at Danasvej 32 in Frederiksberg close to the city centre and Forum Metro station.

=== CABINN Scandinavia ===
In 1992 Niels Fennet expanded with CABINN Scandinavia, bigger than CABINN Express with 201 rooms and 617 beds. It is located around the corner from the first hotel on Vodroffsvej 55 in Frederiksberg, close to The Lakes.

=== CABINN Esbjerg ===
CABINN Esbjerg is from 1994 and was the first hotel outside Copenhagen. The hotel has been expanded several times, most recently in 2007, and now has a capacity of 320 beds in 136 rooms. It is located close to the city's pedestrianized principal shopping street and the main railway station at Skolegade 14. Another 73-room expansion has been announced.

=== CABINN Aarhus ===
CABINN Aarhus is from 2001 and is located at Kannikegade 14, close to the square Store Torv, Aarhus Theatre and Aarhus Cathedral. The hotel has 192 rooms and 486 beds, and the breakfast buffet is on the top floor. There are six different room options to choose from. Commodore, Captain, Standard, Economy, Standard Family, and the luxurious Penthouse. The breakfast buffet consists of cold cuts, cheese, pastries, bread, granola, cereal, yogurt, tea, coffee, juices, and the occasional DIY waffle. CABINN has commissioned a new 400 room hotel which will be designed by C. F. Møller Architects.

=== CABINN City ===
CABINN City opened in 2004 as the fifth hotel in the chain. It is located at Mitchellsgade 14, behind Tivoli Gardens and close to Copenhagen Central Station. The building was designed by Hvidt & Mølgaard and is located next to the historical Copenhagen Police Headquarters which were completed in 1920 to design by Hack Kampmann. The hotel has 352 rooms and 1020 beds.

=== CABINN Odense ===
In 2007, CABINN continued its national expansion with the opening of its hotel in Odense on the island of Funen. The hotel is located at Østre Stationsvej 7-9, next to Odense station and Hans Christian Andersen museum.

=== CABINN Metro ===
CABINN Metro was opened in 2009, Ørestad. The architect Daniel Libeskind designed the hotel which has resulted in a very unusual building with a complex facade and raw walls on the inside. The hotel is one of the biggest in Scandinavia with 710 rooms and 1760 beds. The hotel is close to the Ørestad Station and Copenhagen Airport Kastrup Lufthavn on Arne Jacobsens Allé 2.

=== CABINN Aalborg ===
Aalborg is the fourth-biggest city in Denmark and CABINN Aalborg opened there in 2010. It has 239 rooms and 630 beds.

== Environmental Efforts ==
CABINN strives to limit the release of CO_{2} by using environmentally friendly cleaning companies, sorting at source of trash, non-smoking hotel etc. In the year 2010 CABINN Metro received the Green key from the municipal for their environmental policy.
