= Skodsborg Spa Hotel =

Hotel and health resort in Skodsborg, Denmark

Coordinates: 55.8194°N 12.5739°E

Skodsborg Spa Hotel (Danish: Kurhotel Skodsborg, formerly Skodsborg Kurbad) is a hotel and health resort in Skodsborg, on the Strandvejen coastal road, 15 km north of Copenhagen, Denmark. It was named the Best Luxury Wellness Spa in Europe by the international World Luxury Hotel Awards in 2016.

== History ==
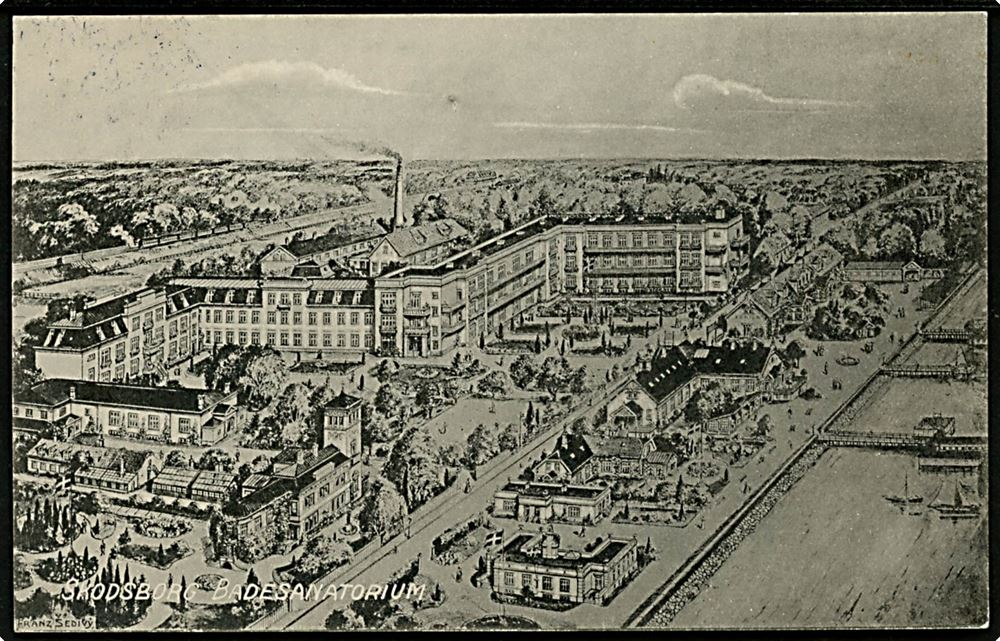
Skodsborg Badesanatorium on a postcard by Franz Šedivý.

Skodsborg Sanitarium (Danish: Skodsborg Badesanatorium) was founded by the physician Carl Ottosen (July 26, 1864 in Elling Parish near Frederikshavn – May 12, 1942 in Skodsborg) and the Seventh-day Adventist Church in 1898. Ottosen's inspiration came from John Harvey Kellogg, for whom he had worked at the Battle Creek Sanitarium. Back in Denmark, he first opened Frydenstrand Sanitarium in association with the Adventist Church's folk high school in Frederikshavn. In 1897, he purchased two buildings in Skodsborg which had previously served as a summer retreat for King Frederick VII and Countess Danner. Skodsborg Sanitarium opened in 1889 where Ottosen also founded Den Sanitære Førevarefabrik (The Sanitary Food Factory). The new sanitarium originally had room for 20 patients but was expanded with a new main building in 1907 when the remaining part of the royal summer residence, Villa Rex, was also acquired. The institution became colloquially known as Den Hvide By (The White Town) or Persilleslottet (Parsley Palace) due to the vegetarian diet that was served to the patients. The sanitarium also served as a training facility for chefs and physiotherapists. Kellogg visited the sanitarium in 1926.

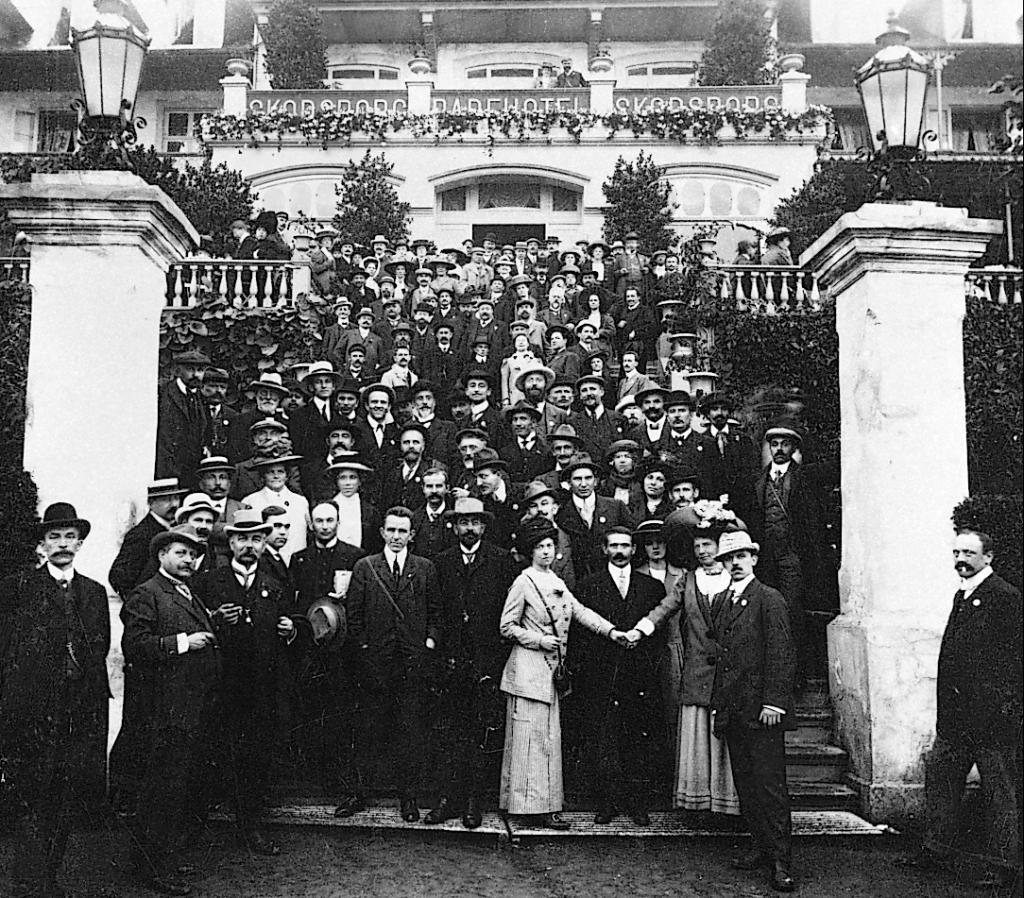
The eight International Socialist Congress held in the hotel, 1910.

In 1910 it hosted the eighth International Socialist Congress, attended by the revolutionary socialist Rosa Luxemburg.

The Adventist Church sold Skodsborg Sanitarium to the Augustinus Foundation in 1992. The complex has been restored and expanded by Henning Larsen Architects.

== Architecture ==
Countess Danner's Mansion is a 13 bay long detached, two-storey wing located to the south of the main building. The building has a half hipped roof with blue tiles. The building, as it appears today, is from 1952, when the original building from 1800 was expanded by Peter Kornerup. It was listed in 1950.

Villa Rex is from 1858 and was designed by Johan Henrik Nebelong. The tower is from 1880. The building was listed in 1994.

== Facilities ==
The Lobby is a combined lounge, restaurant and cocktail bar. The restaurant serves New Nordic cuisine. The head chef is Philip Scheel Grønkjær.

The modern extension contains a large pool area, gym, yoga hall and test rooms.

== Garden ==
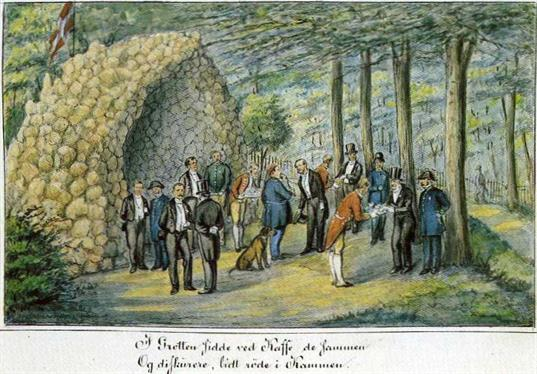
Frederick VII's grotto

In the park to the south of Countess Danner's Mansion is a grotto which was built by Frederick VII in 1853. It is made of travertine, flint and iron slag. Its interior features imitated stalactites and the floor is decorated with pale and dark beach stones set in a star-shaped pattern. A winding, partly internal staircase on the rear side of the mound leads to the top for good views of Skodsborg and the Øresund.

== Bibliography ==
- Søgaard, Torsten : Et halvt år i Skodsborg. Jeppe Aakjærs rekreationsophold på Skodsborg Sanitarium 1927-28 In Søllerødbogen 2013. Historisk Topografisk Selskab.2013
