= Joseph-Jacques Ramée =

French architect (1764–1842)

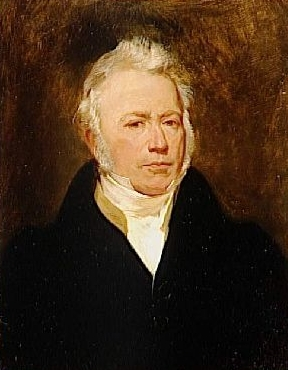
Joseph Ramée in 1832; portrait by Gillot Saint-Evre

Joseph-Jacques Ramée (April 26, 1764 in Charlemont, France — May 18, 1842 at the Chateau de Beaurains, Noyon) was a French architect, interior designer, and landscape architect working within the neoclassicist idiom. He was a student of the architect and landscape architect François-Joseph Bélanger. In his lifetime, he worked in France, Denmark, Germany, Belgium, and the United States. He also published books on landscaping with his own numerous garden designs as examples. Ramée is known for his work at Union College, in Schenectady, New York, where in 1812 he designed the first comprehensively planned college campus in America

== Work at Union College ==
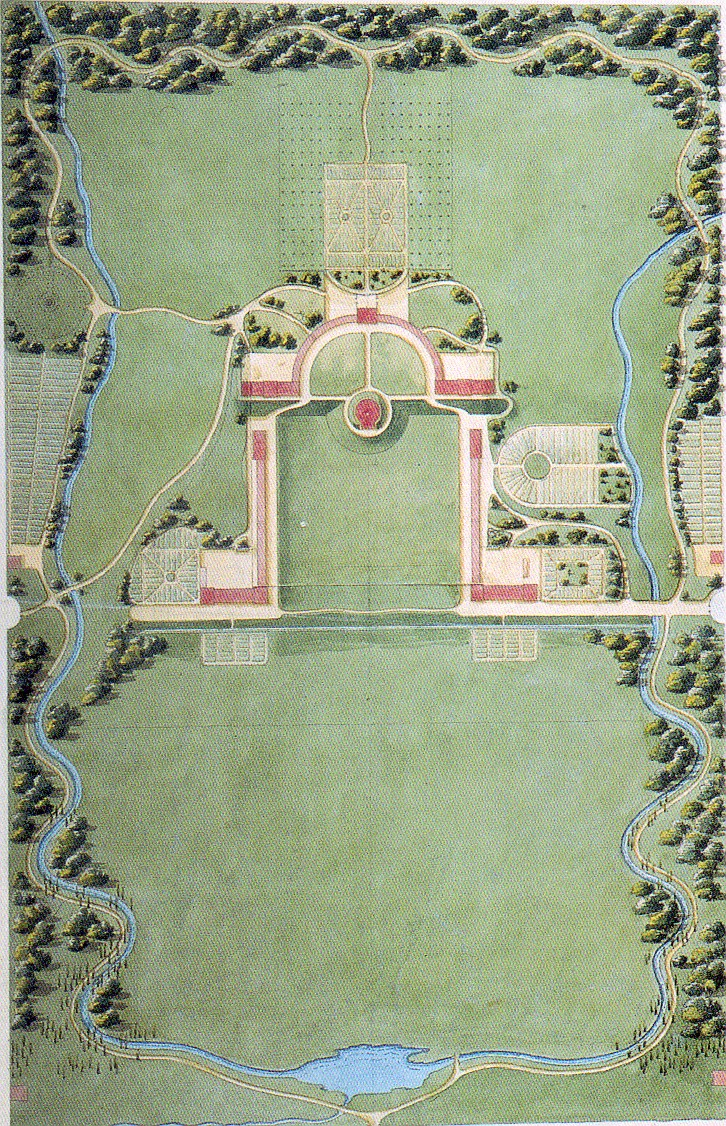
The original 1813 Ramée plan of the Union College campus

By the early 1800s he had already established a reputation as a skilled designer of landscapes combined with houses and other kinds of buildings. New York State land speculator David Parish, for whose father Ramée had designed an estate in Hamburg, Germany, persuaded Ramée to visit America in search of projects.

Ramée arrived in the northern Adirondacks in late 1812 to work on projects in and around the small towns on Parish's vast tracts. Parish also acted as agent in finding Ramée other work. On a return trip to Philadelphia in January 1813, Parish introduced Ramée to Eliphalet Nott, the ambitious president of Union College anxious to relocate the school to a large plot he had already purchased for the purpose. Nott hired Ramée almost immediately to draw up plans for the new campus, for the sum of $1,500.

Ramée worked on the drawings for about a year, and construction of two of the college buildings, North and South Halls, proceeded quickly enough to permit occupation in 1814. The Union College campus thus became the first comprehensively planned college campus in the United States.

== Images ==
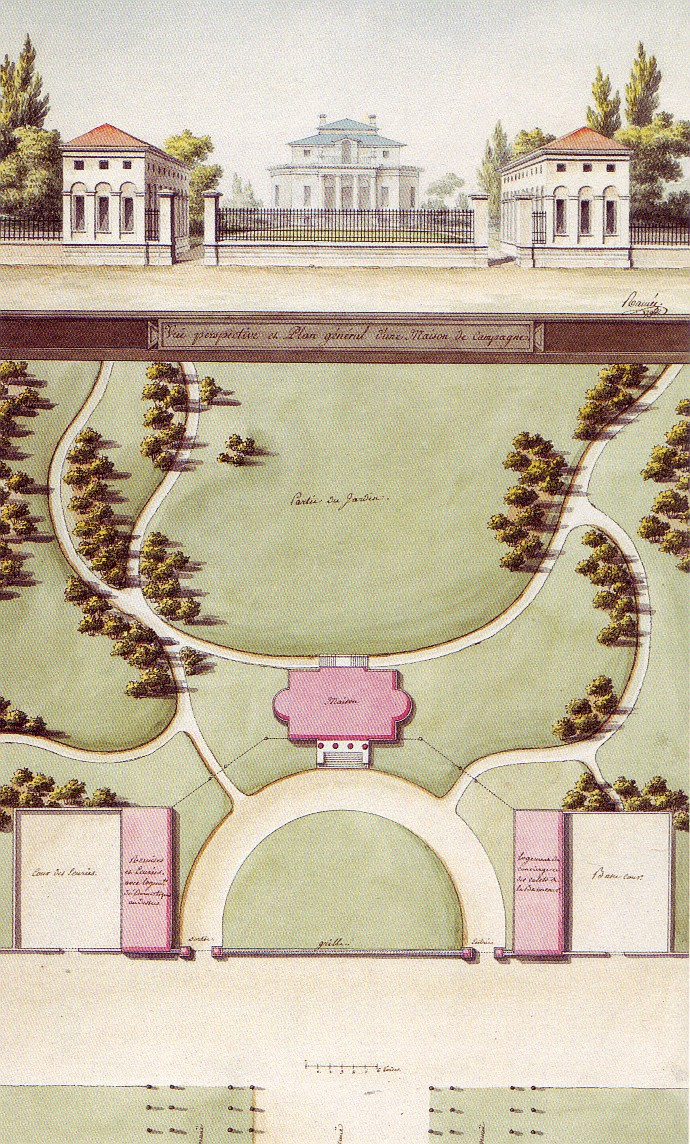
Mansion proposal, front façade and situation plan, 1796

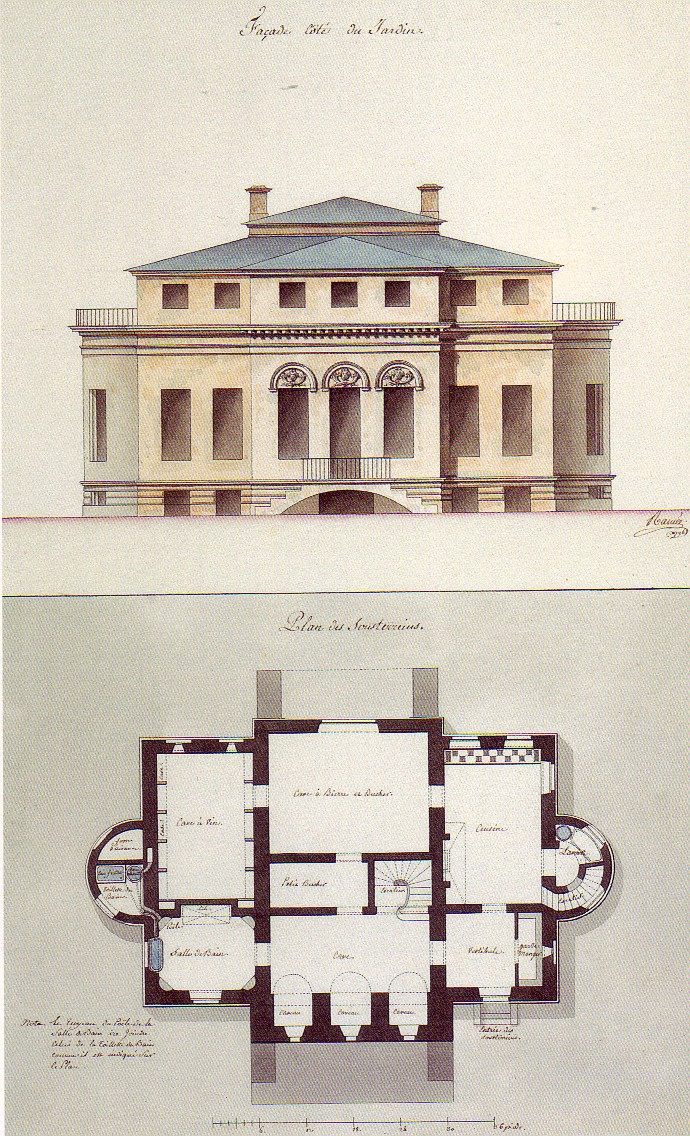
Mansion proposal, garden façade and ground plan, 1796

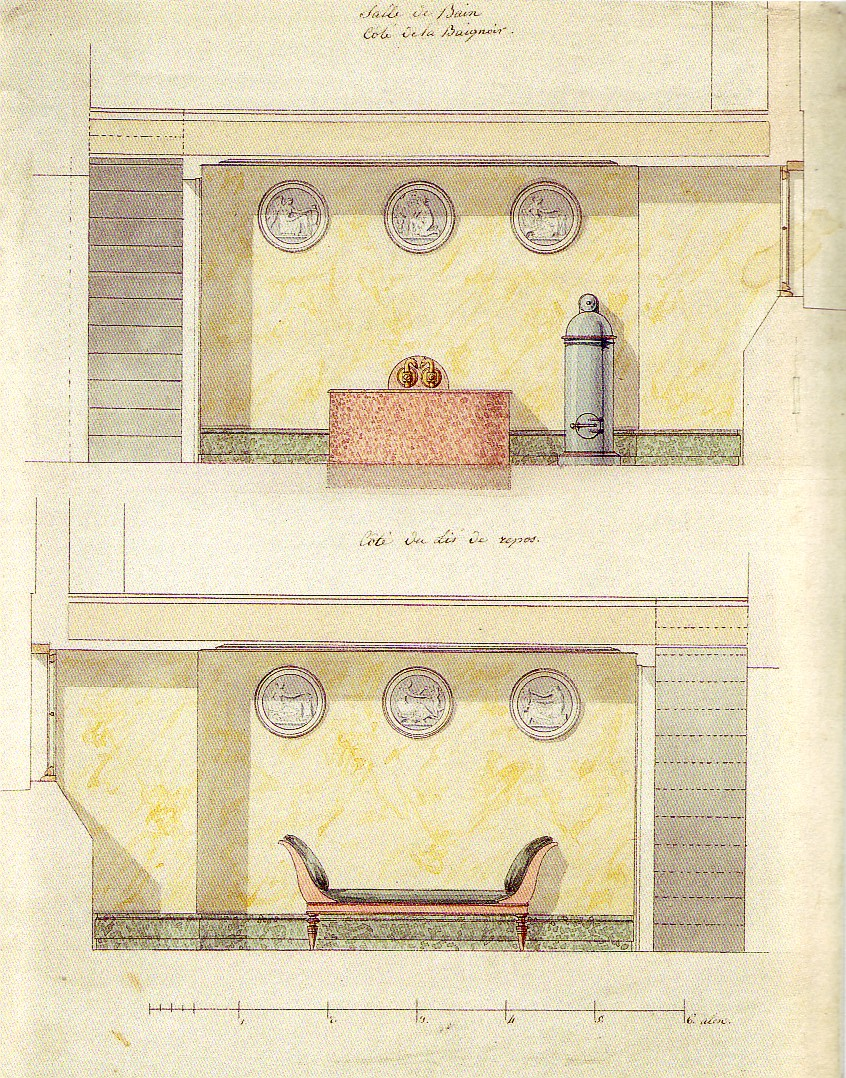
Bathing room in the Brun family townhouse, Copenhagen

== Bibliography ==
- Paul Venable Turner: Joseph Ramée. International Architect of the Revolutionary Era. Cambridge/New York/Melbourne 1996
- Bärbel Hedinger und Julia Berger (Hrsg.): Joseph Ramée, Gartenkunst, Architektur, Dekoration, ein Internationaler Baukünstler des Klassizismus, Altonaer Museum, Deutscher Kunstverlag, München, Berlin 2003 ISBN 3-422-06436-2
- Tunnard, Christopher (1964). Joseph Jacques Ramée: Architect of Union College. Schenectady, New York: Union College. OCLC 5291278.
- Turner, Paul V. (1984). Campus: An American Planning Tradition. Cambridge, Massachusetts: MIT Press. ISBN 0-262-20047-3.
- Turner, Paul V. (1996). Joseph Ramée: International Architect of the Revolutionary Era. Cambridge: Cambridge University Press. ISBN 0-521-49552-0.
