= List of churches in Lyngby-Taarbæk Municipality =

This list of churches in Lyngby-Taarbæk Municipality lists church buildings in Lyngby-Taarbæk Municipality, Denmark.

== National Churches ==
=== Christian's Church ===
Christian's Church
- Christianskirken
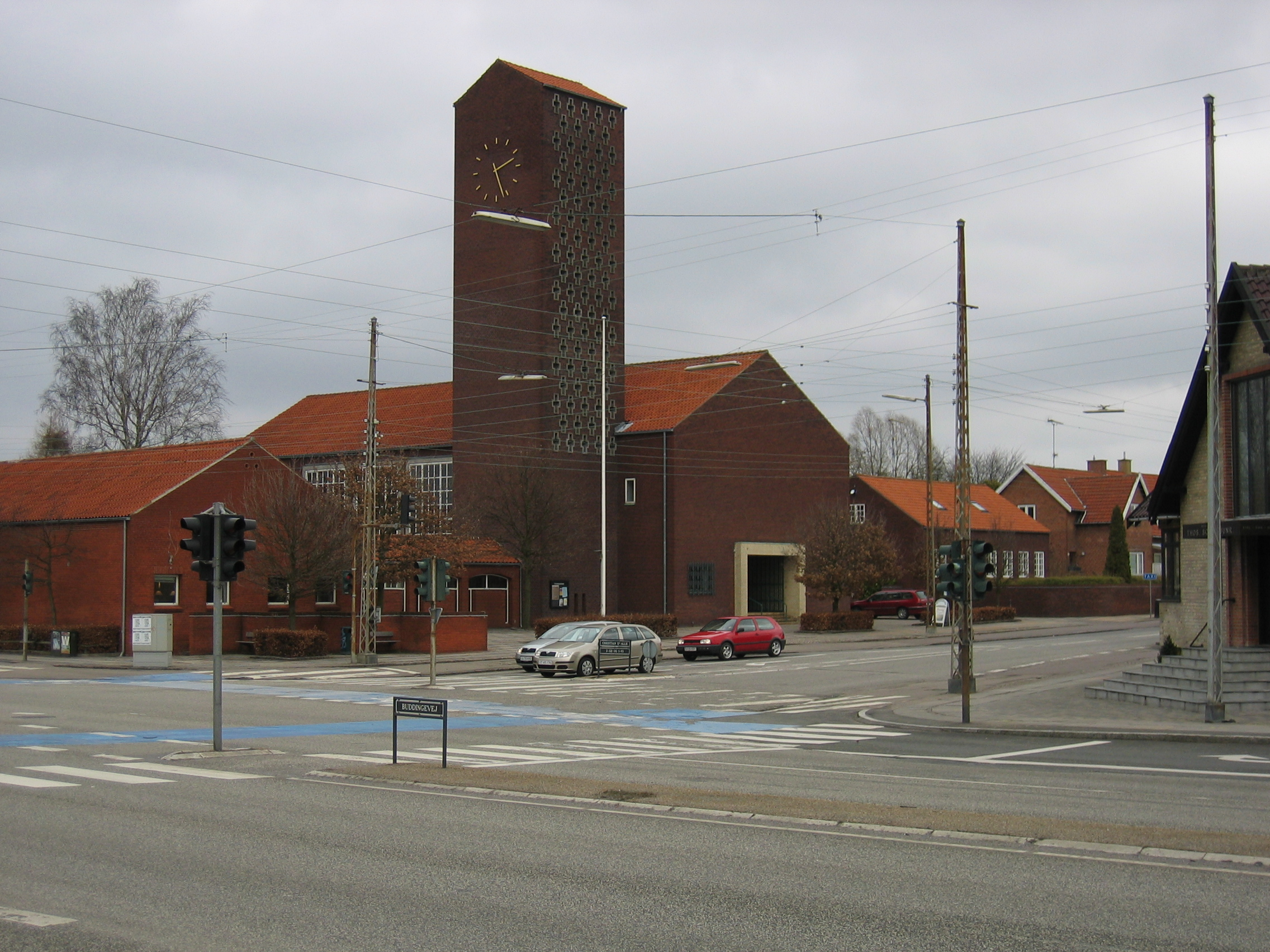
- Christian's Church
- 55°45′54.09″N 12°29′51.95″E
- Location: Kongens Lyngby, Denmark
- Denomination: Church of Denmark

History
- Founded: 1941

Administration
- Diocese: Diocese of Helsingør
- Deanery: Kongens Lyngby Provsti
- Parish: Christians Parish

Christian's Church is located in Kongens Lyngby. It is the only national church in Christians Parish.

The church was founded in 1941, though preparations for the church and a new parish began already in 1934. The church was built by architects Jacob E. Bang and Erik Jensen. The church was opened 3rd Sunday of Advent. King Christian X was present at the opening, and the church is named after him.

There are two church bells in the church, both cast in 1941. They were cast by the foundry "B. Løw & Søn København".

=== Geel Church Hall ===
Geel Church Hall
- Geel Kirkesal
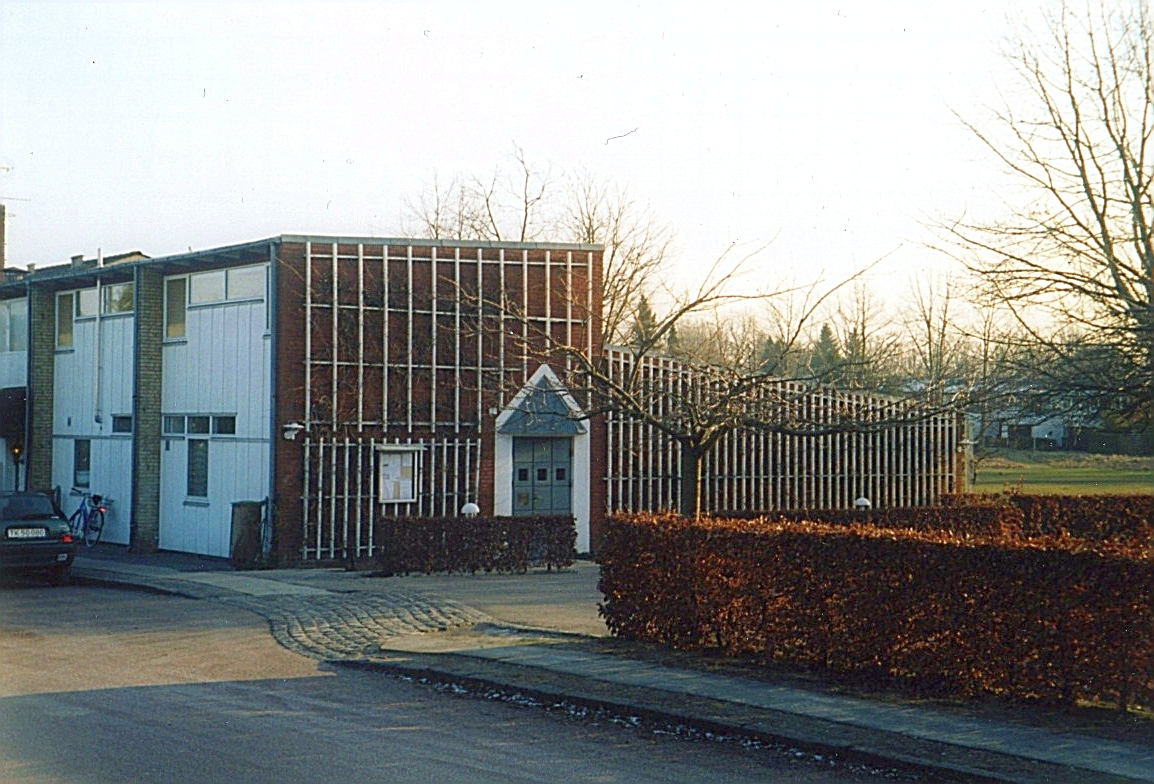
- Geel Church Hall
- 55°47′47.28″N 12°29′37.87″E
- Location: Brede, Denmark
- Denomination: Church of Denmark

History
- Founded: 1991

Administration
- Diocese: Diocese of Helsingør
- Deanery: Kongens Lyngby Provsti
- Parish: Lundtofte Parish

Geel Church Hall is located in Brede. It is one of two churches in Lundtofte Parish.

The church was built in a former local shop, and was opened on 17 March 1991.

=== Lundtofte Church ===
Lundtofte Church
- Lundtofte Kirke
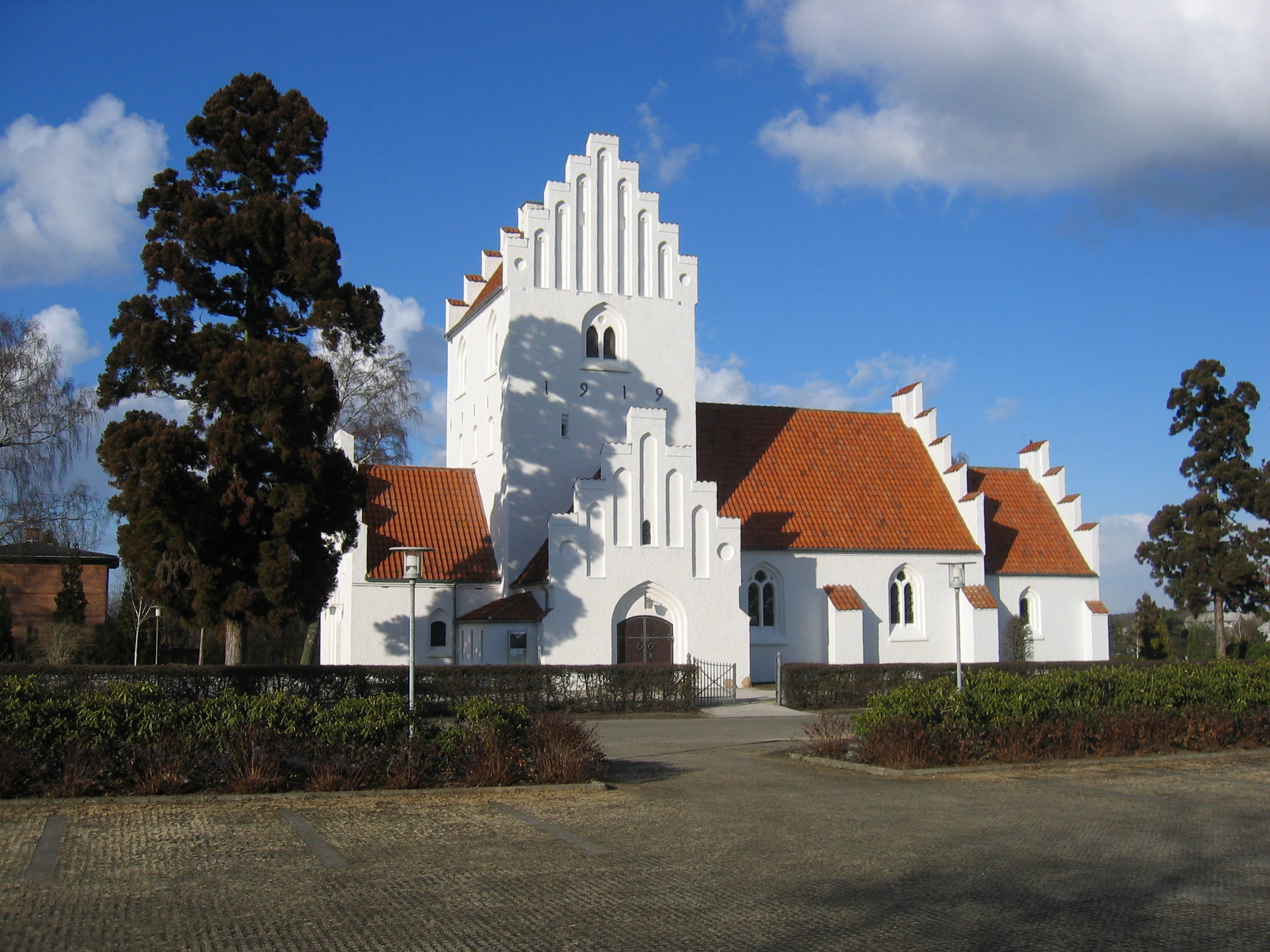
- Lundtofte Church
- 55°47′38.37″N 12°31′7.6″E
- Location: Lundtofte, Denmark
- Denomination: Church of Denmark

History
- Founded: 1921

Specifications
- Capacity: Ca. 200

Administration
- Diocese: Diocese of Helsingør
- Deanery: Kongens Lyngby Provsti
- Parish: Lundtofte Parish

Lundtofte Church is located in Lundtofte. It is one of two churches in Lundtofte Parish. The church has a churchyard with a cemetery.

The church was opened in 1921.

=== Lyngby Church ===
Lyngby Church
- Lyngby Kirke
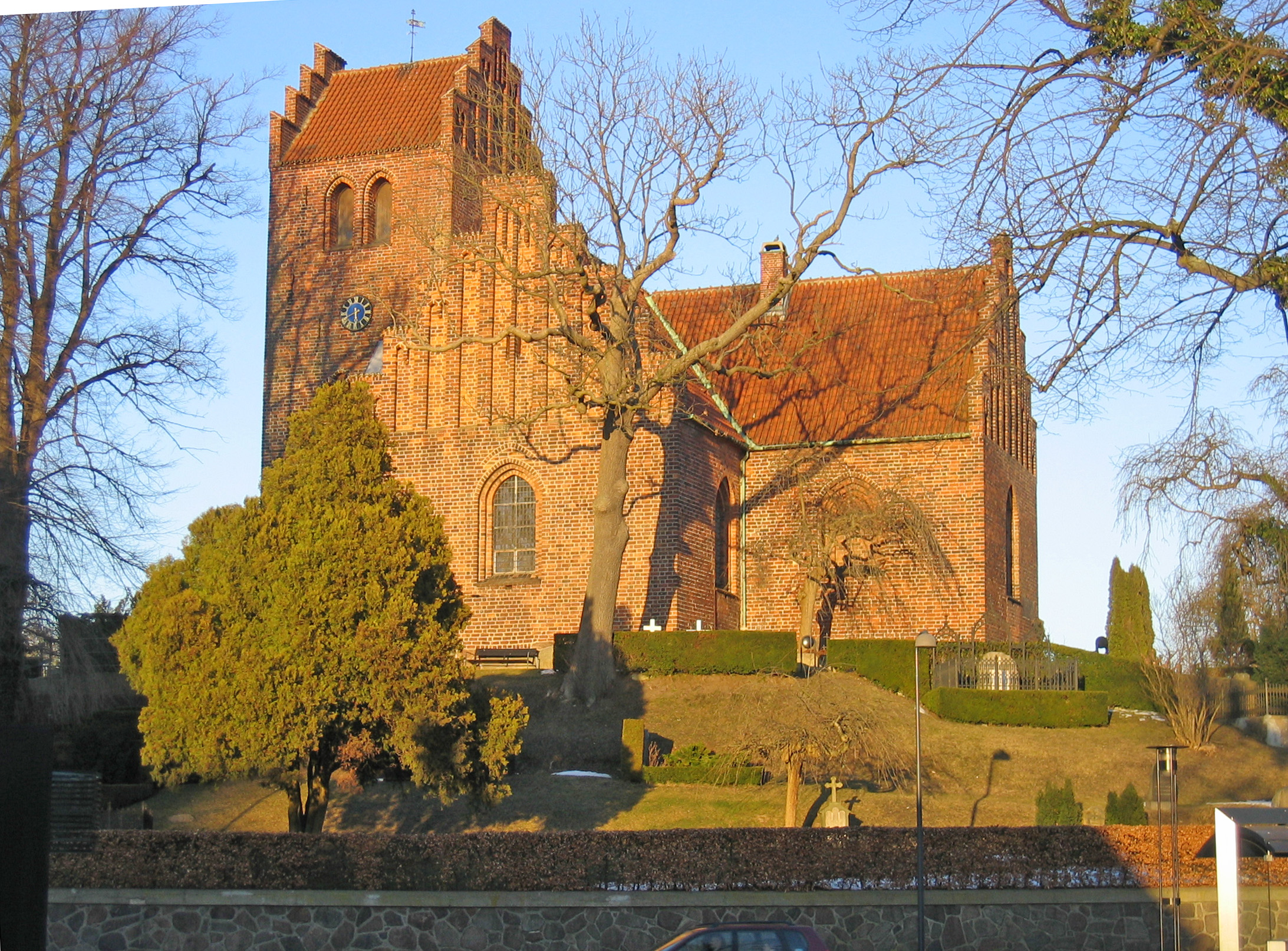
- Lyngby Church
- 55°46′24.68″N 12°30′0.8″E
- Location: Kongens Lyngby, Denmark
- Denomination: Church of Denmark

Architecture
- Completed: 1100s

Administration
- Diocese: Diocese of Helsingør
- Deanery: Kongens Lyngby Provsti
- Parish: Kongens Lyngby Parish

Lyngby Church is located in Kongens Lyngby. It is the only national church in Kongens Lyngby Parish. The church has a churchyard with a cemetery.

The first constructions of the church originate from 1100. A tower was built in the 1400s and the church was rebuilt around year 1500. The church underwent an extensive restoration between 1914–1916 and again in 2011–2012.

=== Sorgenfri Church ===
Sorgenfri Church
- Sorgenfri Kirke
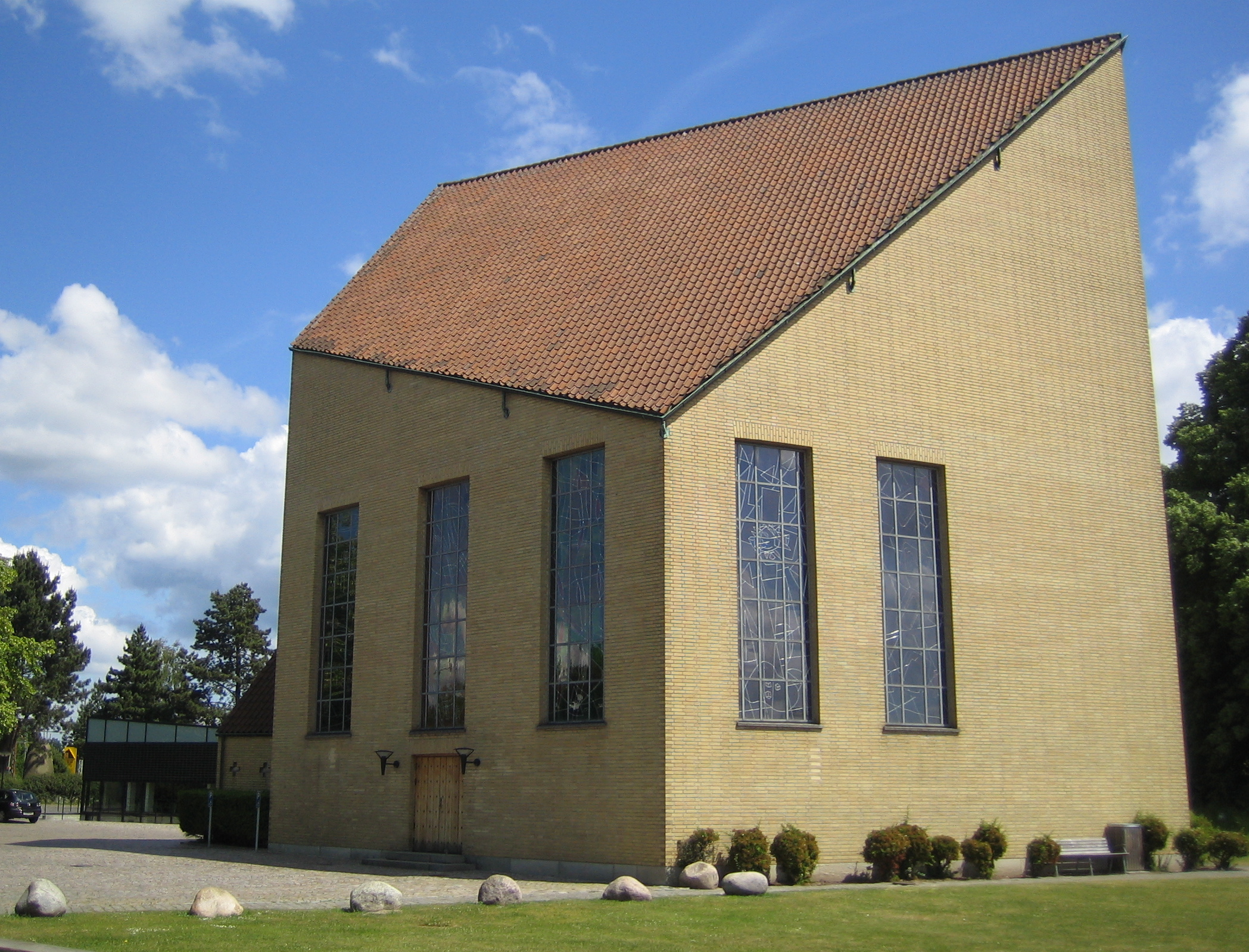
- Sorgenfri Church
- 55°46′47.98″N 12°28′49.15″E
- Location: Sorgenfri, Denmark
- Denomination: Church of Denmark

Architecture
- Completed: 1966

Administration
- Diocese: Diocese of Helsingør
- Deanery: Kongens Lyngby Provsti
- Parish: Sorgenfri Parish

Sorgenfri Church is located in Sorgenfri. It is the only national church in Sorgenfri Parish.

The church was built in year 1966 by architect Tyge Hvass.

=== Taarbæk Church ===
Taarbæk Church
- Taarbæk Kirke
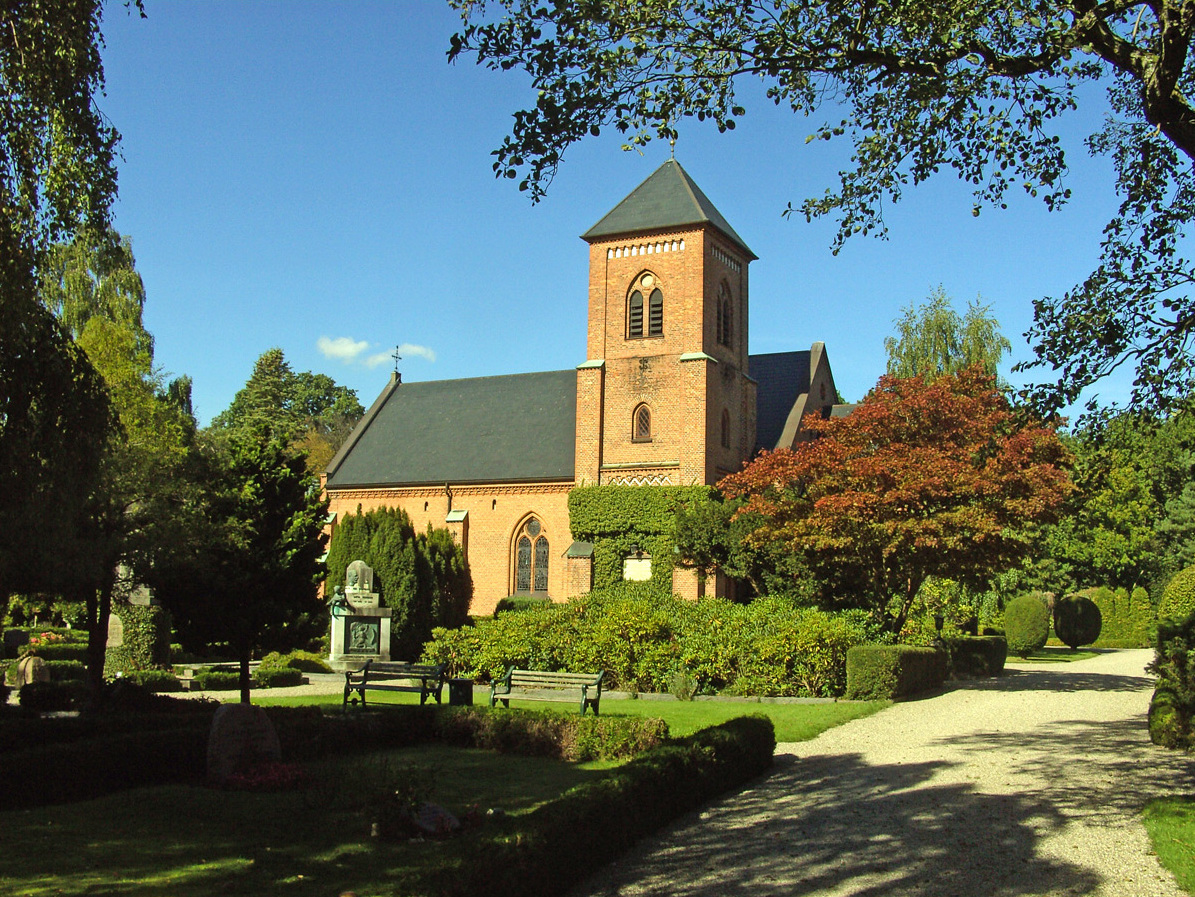
- Taarbæk Church
- 55°47′22.09″N 12°35′22.4″E
- Location: Taarbæk, Denmark
- Denomination: Church of Denmark

History
- Founded: 1864

Administration
- Diocese: Diocese of Helsingør
- Deanery: Kongens Lyngby Provsti
- Parish: Taarbæk Parish

Taarbæk Church is located in Taarbæk. It is the only national church in Taarbæk Parish. The church has a churchyard with a cemetery.

The church was opened in 1864, the cemetery in 1905 and the parish became independent in 1907. The church underwent a minor restoration in 2003.

=== Virum Church ===
Virum Church
- Virum Kirke
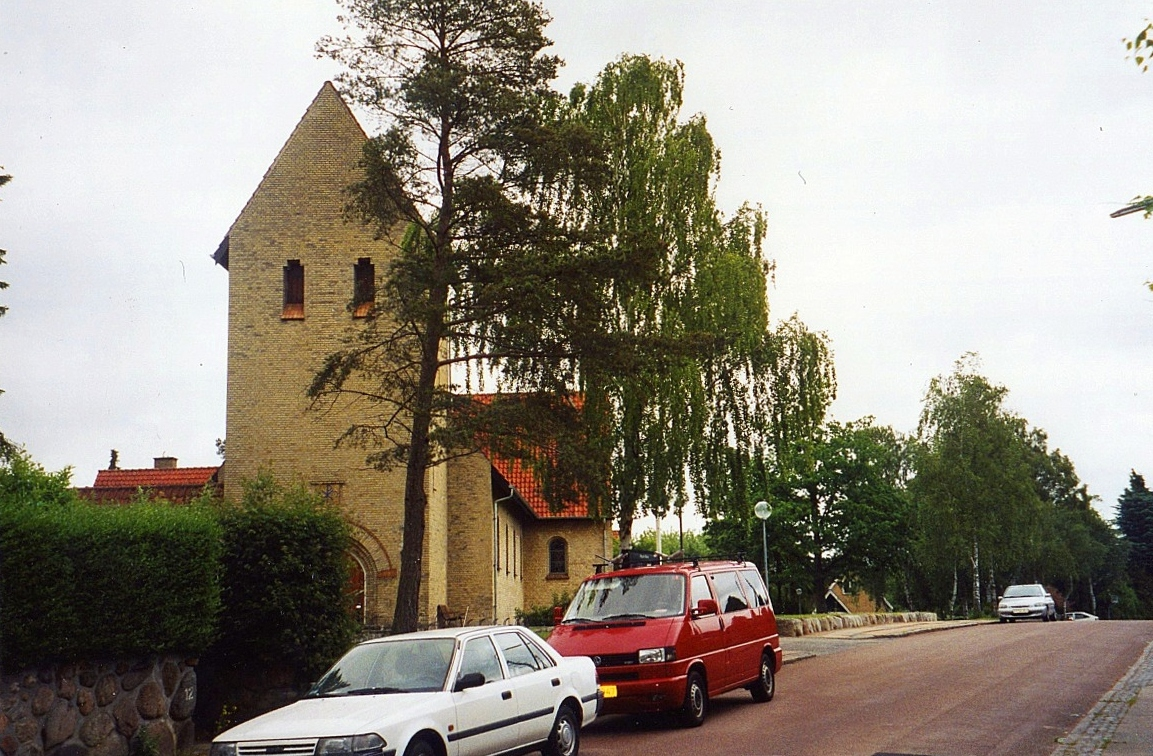
- Virum Church
- 55°47′43.16″N 12°27′47.12″E
- Location: Virum, Denmark
- Denomination: Church of Denmark

History
- Founded: 1937

Architecture
- Completed: 1940

Administration
- Diocese: Diocese of Helsingør
- Deanery: Kongens Lyngby Provsti
- Parish: Virum Parish

Virum Church is located in Virum. It is the only national church in Virum Parish.

The crypt of the church was opened on 28 November 1937, and the church itself was opened on 30 June 1940. The church's architect was Niels Skrivers, who became the first to be buried at the church. Architect Palle Møller was behind a rebuilding in 1957–1959.

== Other churches ==
=== Lyngby Baptist Church ===
Lyngby Baptist Church
- Lyngby Baptistkirke
- 55°46′7.28″N 12°29′43.49″E
- Location: Kongens Lyngby, Denmark
- Denomination: Baptism

History
- Founded: 1951

Architecture
- Completed: 1967

Lyngby Baptist Church is located in Kongens Lyngby.

The congregation in Lyngby was founded in 1951 and the church was built in 1967.

=== Lyngby Independent Church ===
Lyngby Independent Church
- Lyngby Frikirke
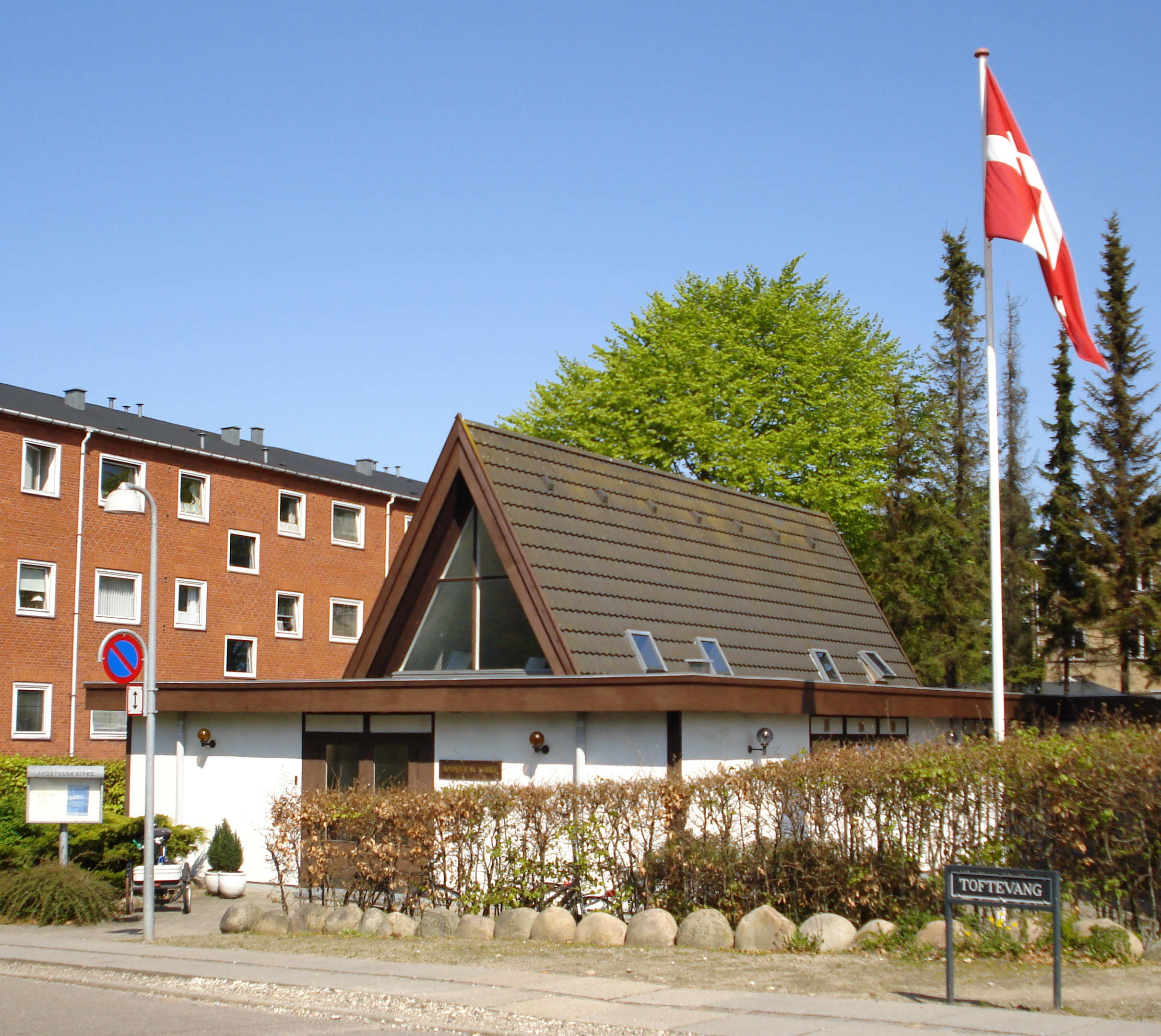
- Lyngby Independent Church
- 55°46′24.02″N 12°30′17.21″E
- Location: Kongens Lyngby, Denmark
- Denomination: Apostolic

Lyngby Independent Church, also known as Apostolic Church Lyngby (Danish: Apostolsk Kirke Lyngby) is located in Kongens Lyngby.

=== Saint Canute Lavard Church ===
Saint Canute Lavard Church
- Sankt Knud Lavard Kirke
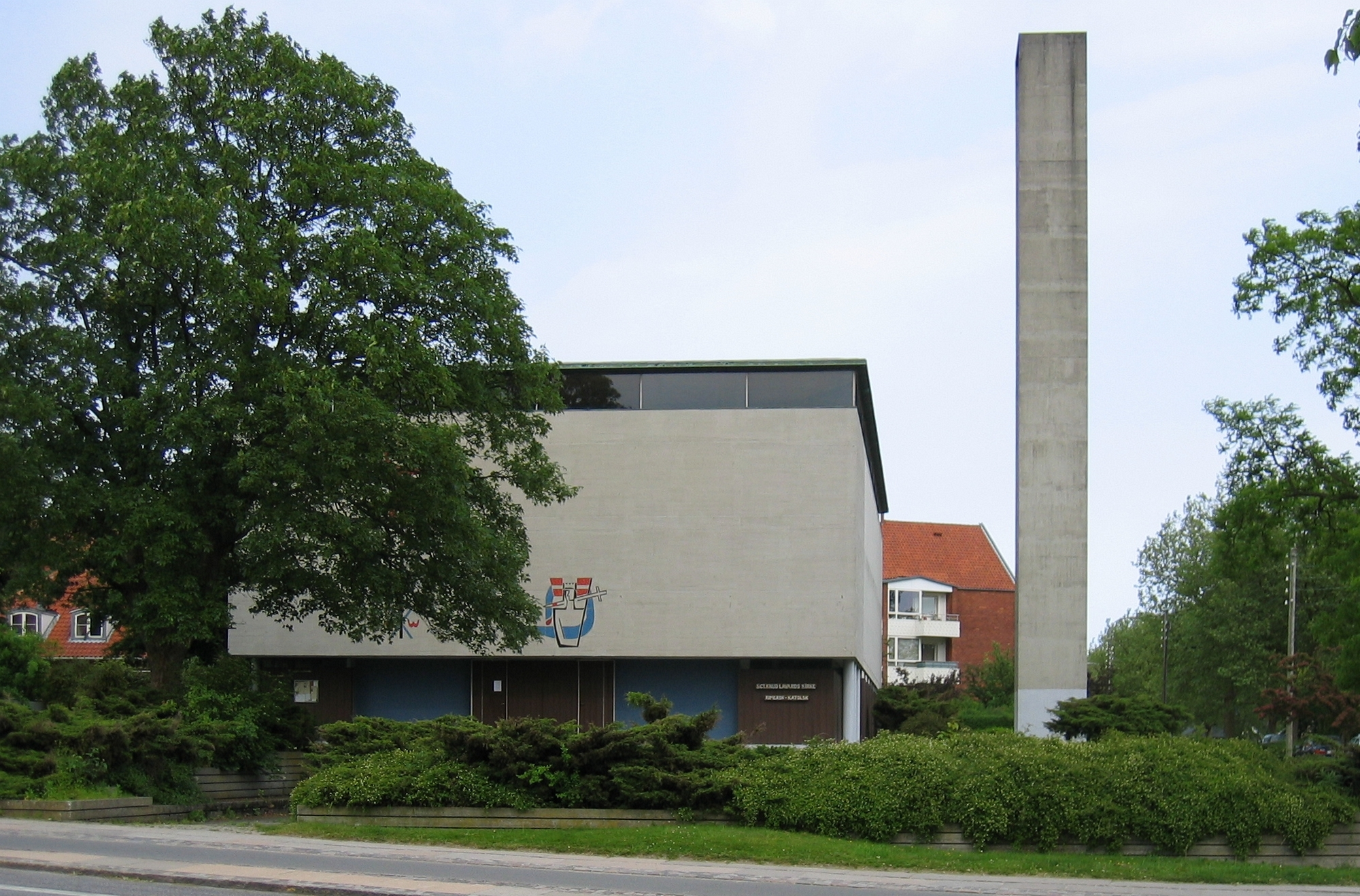
- Saint Canute Lavard Church
- 55°46′29.34″N 12°30′23.66″E
- Location: Kongens Lyngby, Denmark
- Denomination: Catholic Church

Saint Canute Lavard Church is a Catholic church located in Kongens Lyngby.

== Chapels ==
=== Lyngby Park Cemetery Chapel ===
Lyngby Park Cemetery Chapel
- Lyngby Parkkirkegårds Kapel
- 55°47′13.67″N 12°30′43.32″E
- Location: Lundtofte, Denmark
- Denomination: Church of Denmark

Administration
- Diocese: Diocese of Helsingør
- Deanery: Kongens Lyngby Provsti
- Parish: Lundtofte Parish

Lyngby Park Cemetery Chapel is located in Lyngby Park Cemetery in Lundtofte.

=== Sorgenfri Cemetery Chapel ===
Sorgenfri Cemetery Chapel
- Sorgenfri Kirkegårdskapel
- 55°46′47.26″N 12°29′23.27″E
- Location: Sorgenfri, Denmark
- Denomination: Church of Denmark

Administration
- Diocese: Diocese of Helsingør
- Deanery: Kongens Lyngby Provsti
- Parish: Sorgenfri Parish

Sorgenfri Cemetery Chapel is located in Sorgenfri Cemetery in Sorgenfri.
