= Birgit Aagard-Svendsen =

Danish business executive

Birgit Aagard-Svendsen (born 29 February 1956) is a Danish business executive who as of September 2015, became the executive vice-president and chief financial officer of the J. Lauritzen shipping company in Copenhagen, Denmark.

== Career ==
Aagard-Svendsen graduated in engineering from Danmarks Ingeniørakademi (1980) and in business administration at Copenhagen's Handelshøjskolen (1985). Before joining J. Lauritzen in 1998, she held management positions at Tele Danmark (1996–98) and Nordisk Film (1996–98). She has previously been chairman of the Infrastructure Commission and also headed the Committee on Corporate Governance.

Aagard-Svendsen is married to Rolf Aagaard-Svendsen, a former mayor of Lyngby-Taarbæk, and has two daughters. In 2008, she was named businesswoman of the year by the Danish newspaper Berlingske.
