= Ravnholm =

- Neighbourhood
- Location in the Capital Region of Denmark
- Coordinates: 55°48′11.88″N 12°31′16.32″E
- Country: Denmark
- Region: Capital Region
- Municipality: Lyngby-Taarbæk
- Time zone: UTC+1 (CET)
  - Summer (DST): UTC+2 (CEST)

Ravnholm is a neighbourhood in Lyngby-Taarbæk Municipality, located north of Copenhagen. It is located north of Lundtofte and east of Ørholm, bordering Ravnholm Forest in Rudersdal Municipality to the north. IBM has an office building in Ravnholm, the building built in 1991 by architects Jørgen Bo, Anders Hegelund and PLH Arkitekter.
