= Brede, Denmark =

Brede
- Neighbourhood
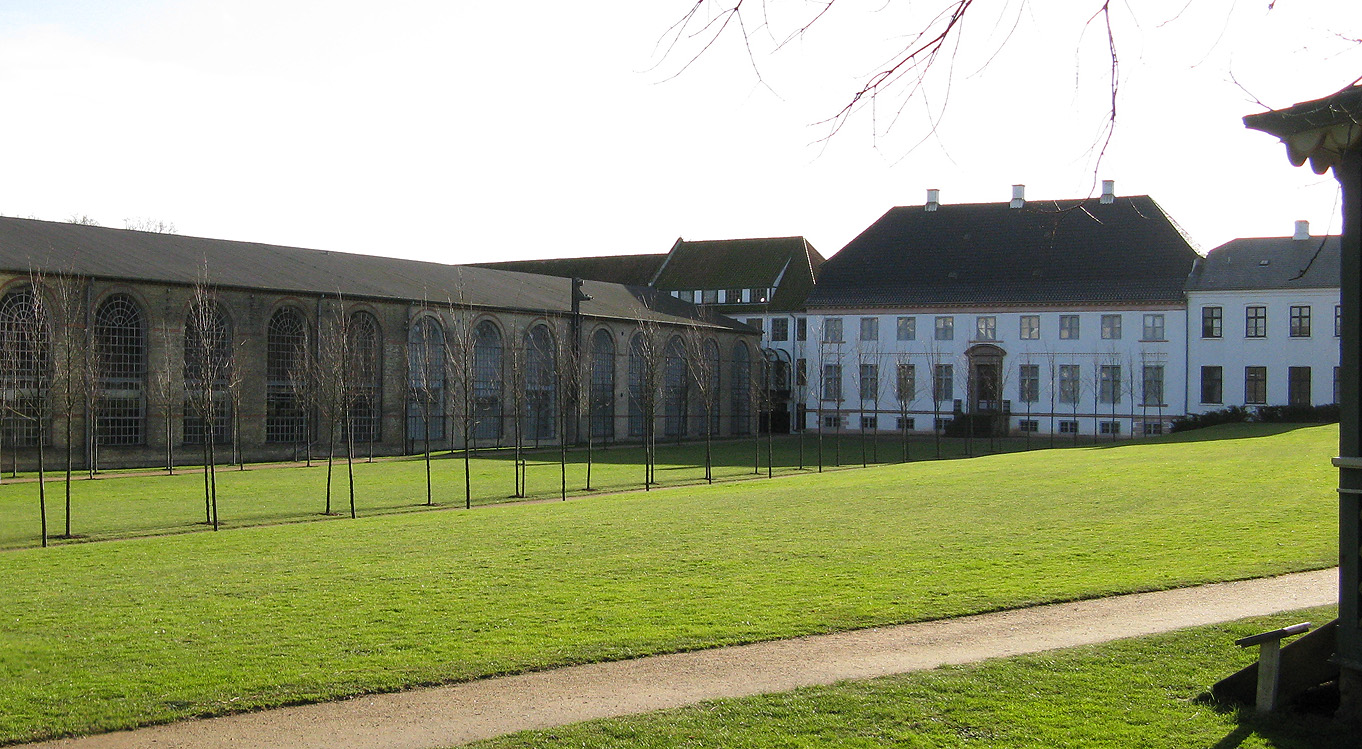
- Brede Works main building and park

- Location in the Capital Region of Denmark
- Coordinates: 55.79250°N 12.50600°E
- Country: Denmark
- Region: Capital Region
- Municipality: Lyngby-Taarbæk
- Time zone: UTC+1 (CET)
  - Summer (DST): UTC+2 (CEST)

Brede is a neighbourhood (Danish: bydel, a named neighbourhood) 14 km north of Copenhagen, Denmark. It is located east of Virum, south of Ørholm, west of Lundtofte and north of Sorgenfri. Frilandsmuseet (The Open Air Museum), and the heritage-listed former industrial complex Brede Works, are located in Brede. Nærumbanen stops in Brede. Vrede House, a Neoclassical mansion built for the owner of Brede Works, is now operated as a historic house museum.

== Notable people ==
- Ferdinand Richardt (born in Brede; 1819–1895), artist and lithographer
- Bille August (born 1948 in Brede), director, screenwriter, and cinematographer
