= Søren Rasmussen =

Søren Rasmussen may refer to:

- Søren Egge Rasmussen (born 1961), Danish politician and MF
- Søren P. Rasmussen (born 1967), Danish politician and former mayor
- Sørenn Rasmussen (born 1976), Danish handballer
