= Niels Brock Copenhagen Business College =

Business school in Copenhagen, Denmark ranking

- Type: Secondary and post-secondary education
- Established: 1881
- Rector: Anya Eskildsen (2015)
- Administrative staff: 350
- Students: 16,000 (2026)
- Location: Copenhagen, Denmark
- Website: https://brock.dk/

Niels Brock Copenhagen Business College, usually referred to simply as Niels Brock, is a school of secondary education and post-secondary education in Copenhagen, Denmark. The school offers programmes within business and management including Vocational Education and Training (VET), Higher Commercial Examination Programme (HHX), Bachelor in Business Administration, Master in International Business Management, Master of Business Administration, and supplementary courses for adults seeking to maintain qualifications. It is an independent self-governing institution under the Danish education system, managed by a board composed of members from the business community in conjunction with a rector that oversees day-to-day operations.

== History ==
The school is the product of a merger between two educational institutions which were both founded in the 1880s. Copenhagen Business College (Danish: Købmandsskolen i København) was founded by the Association for the Education of Young Businessmen (Danish: Foreningen til Unge Handelsmænds Uddannelse) in 1881. From 1901, it was based in a building designed by Valdemar and Bernhard Ingemann and situated on the corner of Fiolstræde with Nørre Voldgade. The Brockian Business Schools (Danish: De Brockske Handelsskoler) were established in 1888 with funding left by the businessman Niels Brock in his will. In 1908, Copenhagen Business College took over the Brockian Business School but they continued as separate institutions under one management until their official merger when Copenhagen Business College became a self-governing institution in 1964. The name was changed to Niels Brock Copenhagen Business College in 1991. In 2009–2012, Copenhagen Business Academy was spun off as an independent institution along with vocational programmes that had previously been under Niels Brock, including Copenhagen Hospitality College and the Academy of Chemical and Biotechnical Science.

== Accreditation ==
Niels Brock Copenhagen Business College is accredited by the Accrediting Council for Independent Colleges and Schools to award the Post-Secondary Business Vocational Education and Training certificate and the Bachelor of Science degree in Business Administration.

== Campus ==
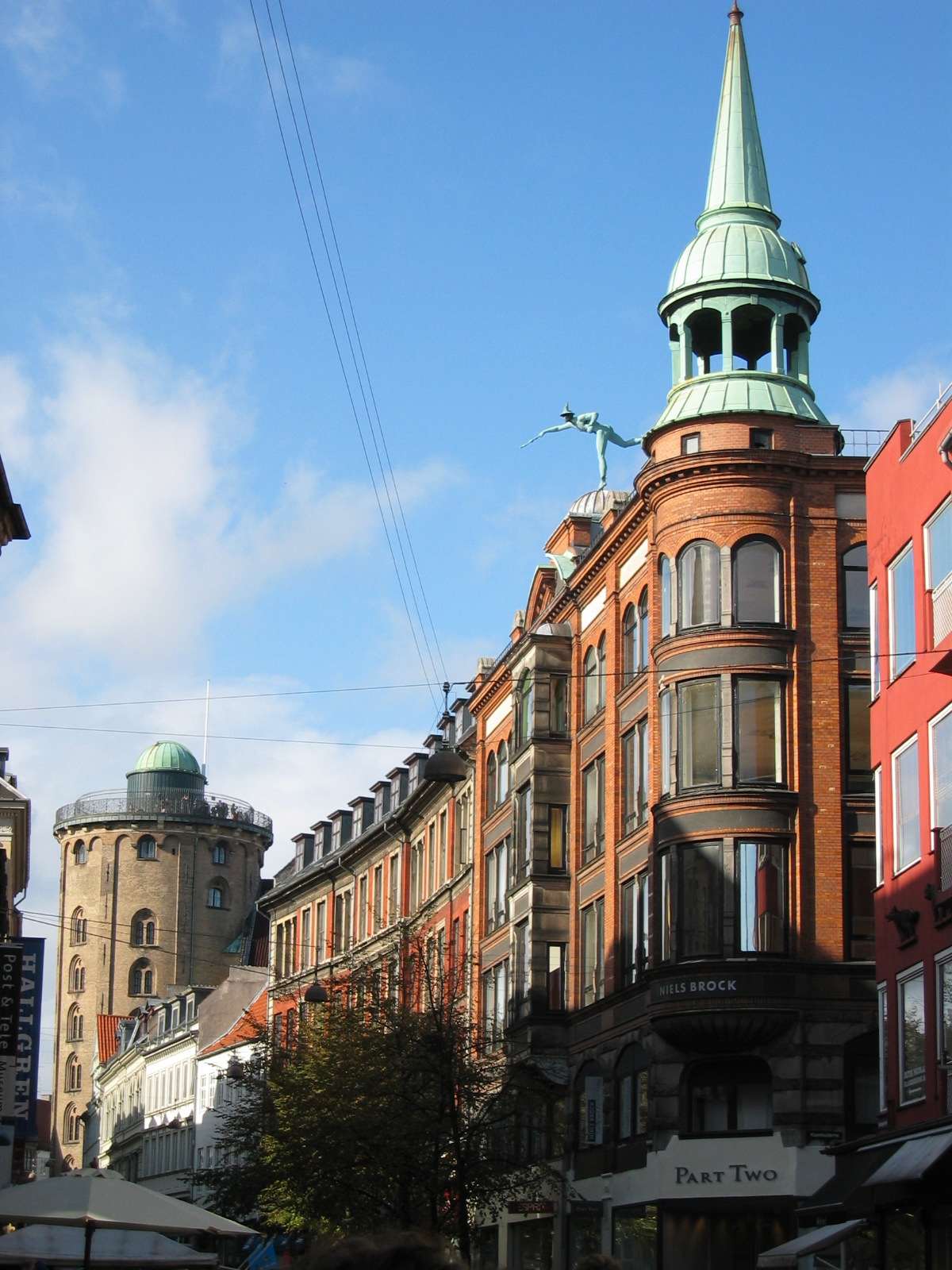
Niels Brock's building at Klareboderne 1

=== Nørre Voldgade 34 ===
The headquarters are located on Nørre Voldgade No. 34. The building was built for the school in 1939 to design by Povl Baumann. It houses the school's administration and management as well as the Brock Online Academy, single-course students, and programmes for older students. Moreover, the building houses the American Bachelor of Science in Business Administration and Bachelor, Pre-Master and Master programmes offered from De Montfort University, UK.

=== Julius Thomsens Plads 6 and 10 ===
The upper secondary school Handelsgymnasiet JTP and the innovation gymnasium are located at Julius Thomsens Plads No. 6. and 10.

=== Linnésgade 2 ===
Det Internationale Gymnasium (English: The International Gymnasium), an upper secondary school located at Linnésgade 2 in the centre of Copenhagen, opened in 2016. Det Internationale Gymnasium, commonly also referred to as Linnésgade among people involved with Niels Brock, houses the International Business Baccalaureate, as well as the Business Elite lines.

=== Kultorvet 2 ===
Vocational Education and Training (VET) are based in the former Copenhagen Central Library on Kultorvet in the city centre. The building is from 1957 and was designed by O. Gundlach-Petersen and Ebbe Andresen.

=== H. C. Andersens Boulevard 2 ===
MBA and Executive programmes (Niels Brock Executive) take place in a building on H. C. Andersens Boulevard (No. 2)

=== H. C. Andersens Boulevard 2 ===
Short programmes take place in a building on the corner of H. C. Andersens Boulevard 2 and Vester Farimagsgade.

== See also ==
- Copenhagen Technical College
- Copenhagen North Business College
