= Sofia Osmani =

Danish politician

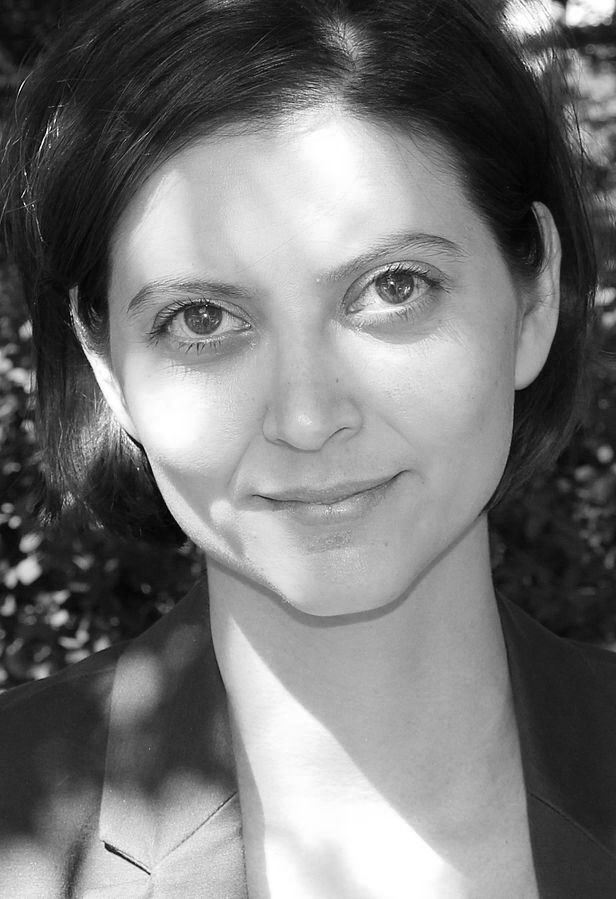

Mayor of Lyngby-Taarbæk Municipality
- Incumbent
- Assumed office 1 January 2014
- Preceded by: Søren P. Rasmussen (V)

Personal details
- Born: 20 March 1979 Virum, Denmark
- Party: Conservative People's Party

Sofia Osmani (born 20 March 1979) is a Danish politician from Virum who has served as mayor of Lyngby-Taarbæk Municipality since 2013, elected for the Conservative People's Party. She was first elected to the municipal council in the 2001 local elections.
