= Lyngby-Taarbæk Municipality =

Lyngby-Taarbæk Municipality Lyngby-Taarbæk Kommune (Danish)
- Municipality
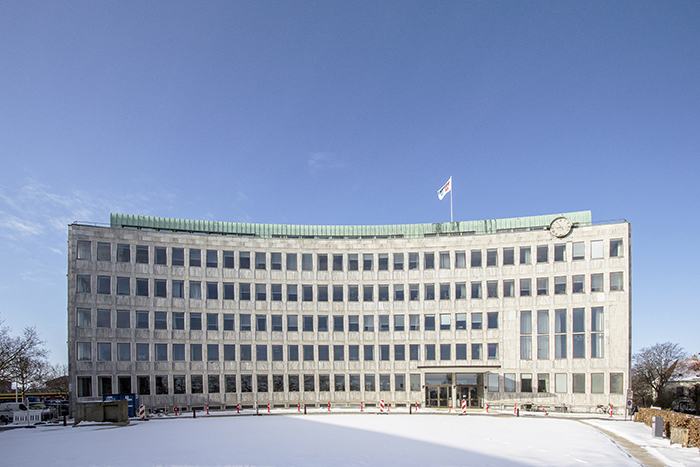
- Lyngby town hall

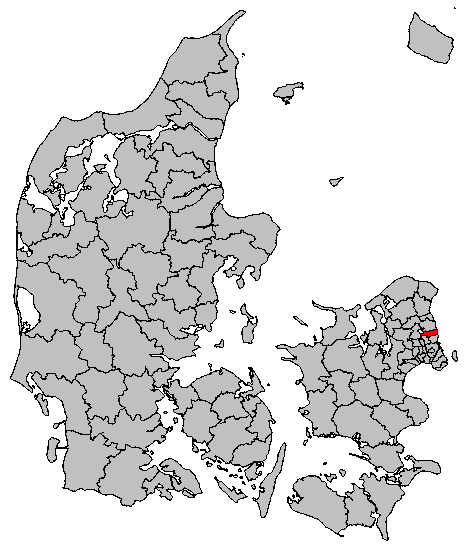
- Coordinates: 55°47′00″N 12°30′00″E
- Country: Denmark
- Region: Capital Region
- Established: April 1, 1970
- Seat: Kongens Lyngby

Government
  - Mayor: Sofia Osmani (C)

Area
  - Total: 38.88 km^{2} (15.01 sq mi)

Population (1. January 2026)
  - Total: 58,614
  - Density: 1,508/km^{2} (3,905/sq mi)
- Time zone: UTC+1 (CET)
  - Summer (DST): UTC+2 (CEST)
- Postal codes: 2800, 2930
- Municipal code: 173
- Website: www.ltk.dk

Lyngby-Taarbæk Municipality (occasionally spelled Lyngby-Tårbæk, Danish: Lyngby-Taarbæk Kommune) is a municipality (Danish: kommune) in the Capital Region of Denmark near Copenhagen on the eastern coast of the island of Zealand (Danish: Sjælland). It is part of the Greater Copenhagen area. The municipality borders Rudersdal Municipality to the north, Furesø Municipality to the west and Gladsaxe and Gentofte Municipality to the south. It borders the Øresund to the east.

The municipality covers an area of 39 km^{2}, and has a population of 58,614 (2026). Its mayor is Sofia Osmani, a member of the Conservative People's Party. The main town and the site of its municipal council is the town of Kongens Lyngby.

Lyngby-Taarbæk Municipality was not merged with any other municipality in the municipal reform of 2007.

== History ==
In the Middle Ages, when Denmark was divided into syssels, Lyngby-Taarbæk was part of Østersyssel. It later became a part of Copenhagen Fief, which was changed to Copenhagen County in 1661. Although Copenhagen County changed many times over the years, Lyngby-Taarbæk always remained within the borders. When the counties were disestablished in 2007, Lyngby-Taarbæk came under the new Capital Region of Denmark.

Since 1842, and until the 1970 Danish Municipal Reform, Lyngby-Taarbæk was a parish municipality. It became a regular municipality with the 1970 reform, and its borders have remained unchanged since. Lyngby-Taarbæk wasn't merged with any other municipality in the 2007 municipal reform.

== Neighbourhoods ==
Nearly the entirety of Lyngby-Taarbæk Municipality is part of the Greater Copenhagen area and so there are no towns or villages in the municipality. Instead there are named neighbourhoods. On the list below are all the neighbourhoods with counted populations (numbers as of 2018).

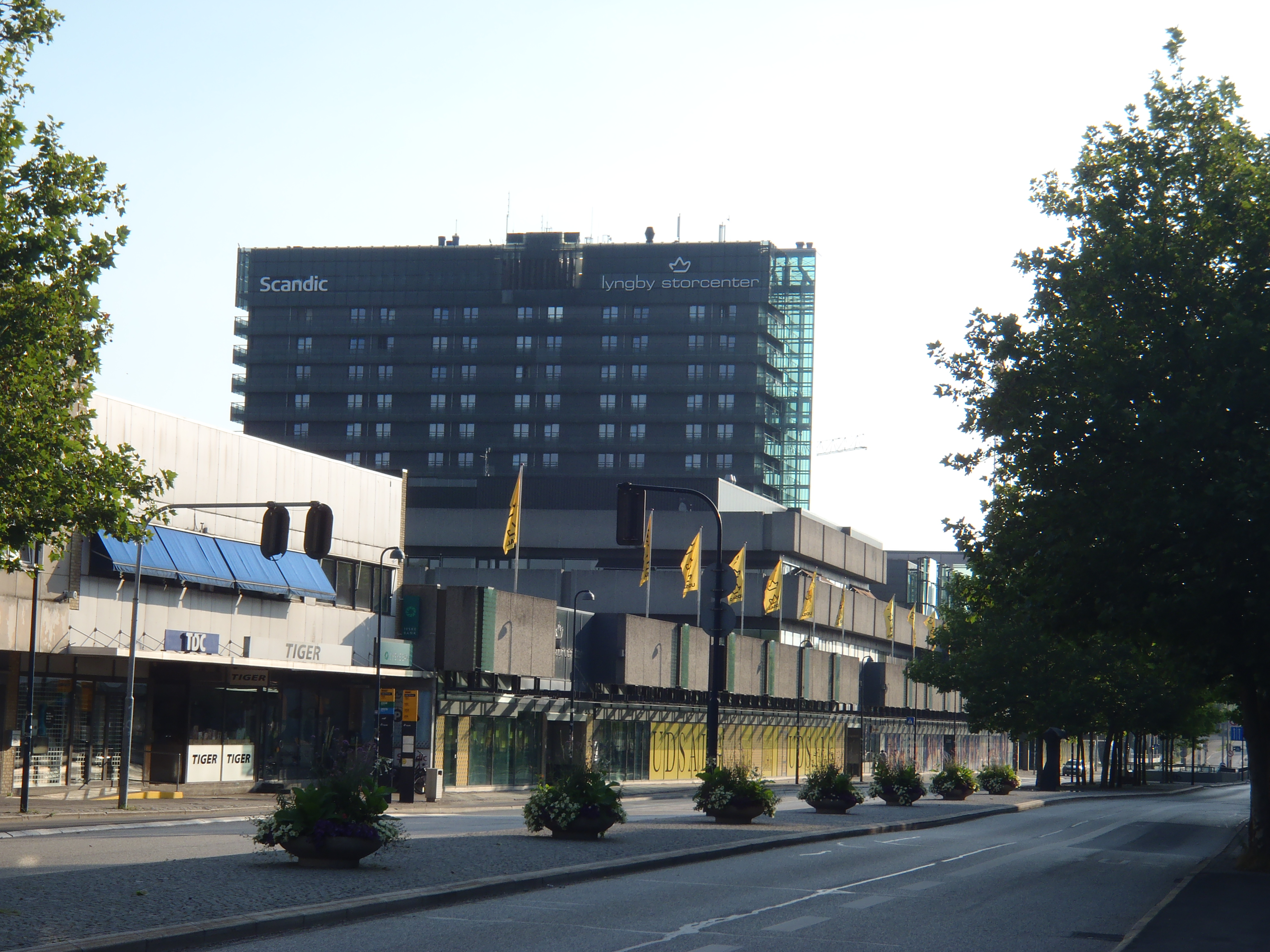
Lyngby Storcenter.

Virum	14,454
Kongens Lyngby	12,214
Ulrikkenborg	9,419
Sorgenfri	6,479
Lundtofte	6,210
Hjortekær	5,199
Taarbæk	1,498

=== Kongens Lyngby ===
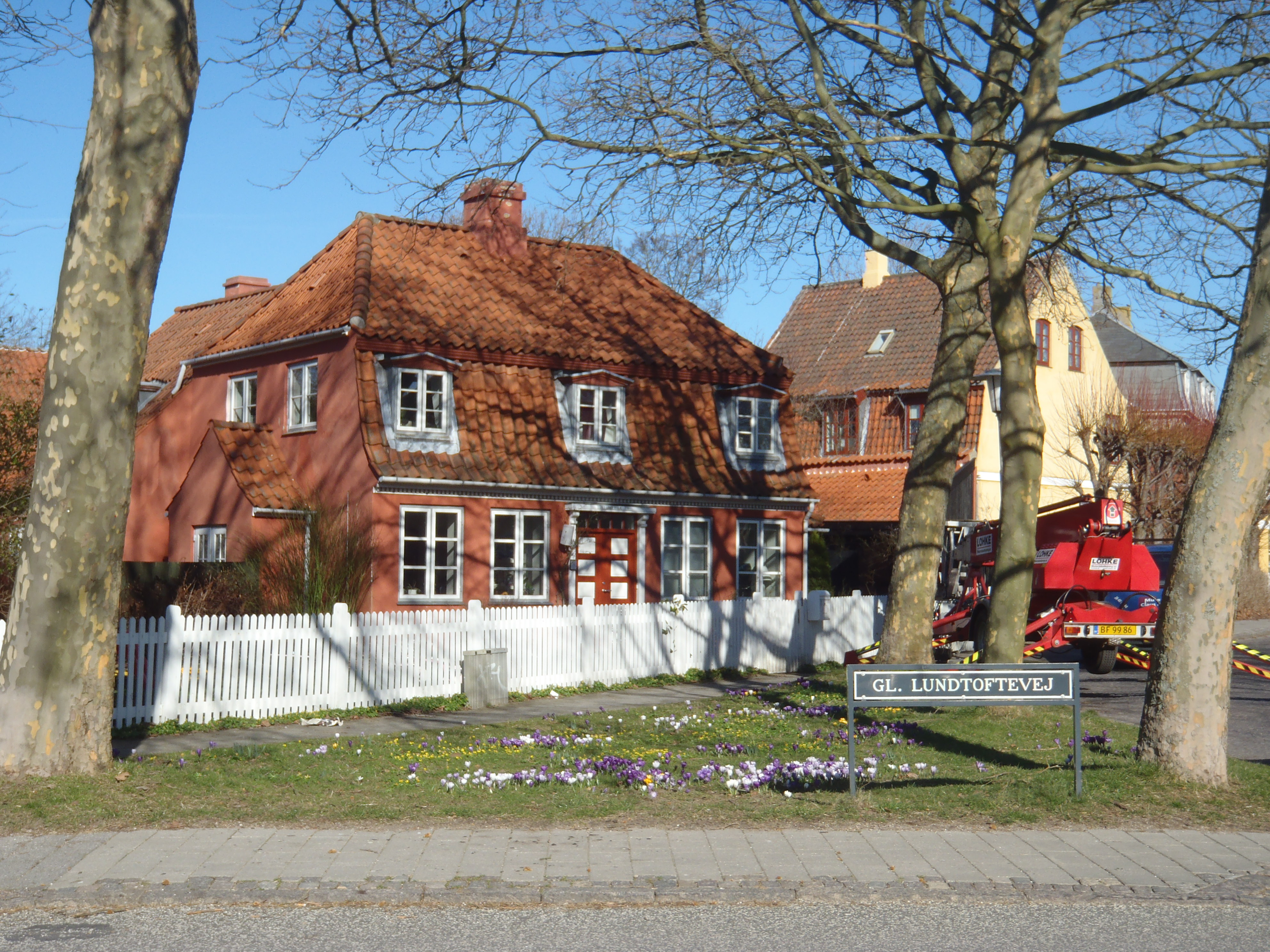
House in Bondebyen.

Kongens Lyngby (or simply Lyngby) is located in the southern part of the municipality. The neighbourhoods of Fuglevad, Lundtofte and Fortunen borders Kongens Lyngby to the north. Also bordering Kongens Lyngby are Bagsværd to the west and Buddinge to the south, both located in Gladsaxe Municipality. Also to the south are Vangede and to the east is Jægersborg, both located in Gentofte Municipality. Lyngby Lake is located north of the neighbourhood. The neighbourhood primarily consists of residential buildings, though in the north are numerous facilities and shops, including the mall Lyngby Storcenter. Also located in this area is the neighbourhood's train station and city hall, as well as Lyngby Church.

Bondebyen is a former village, now a part of Kongens Lyngby. Many of the old buildings of the village are preserved and are protected.

=== Taarbæk ===
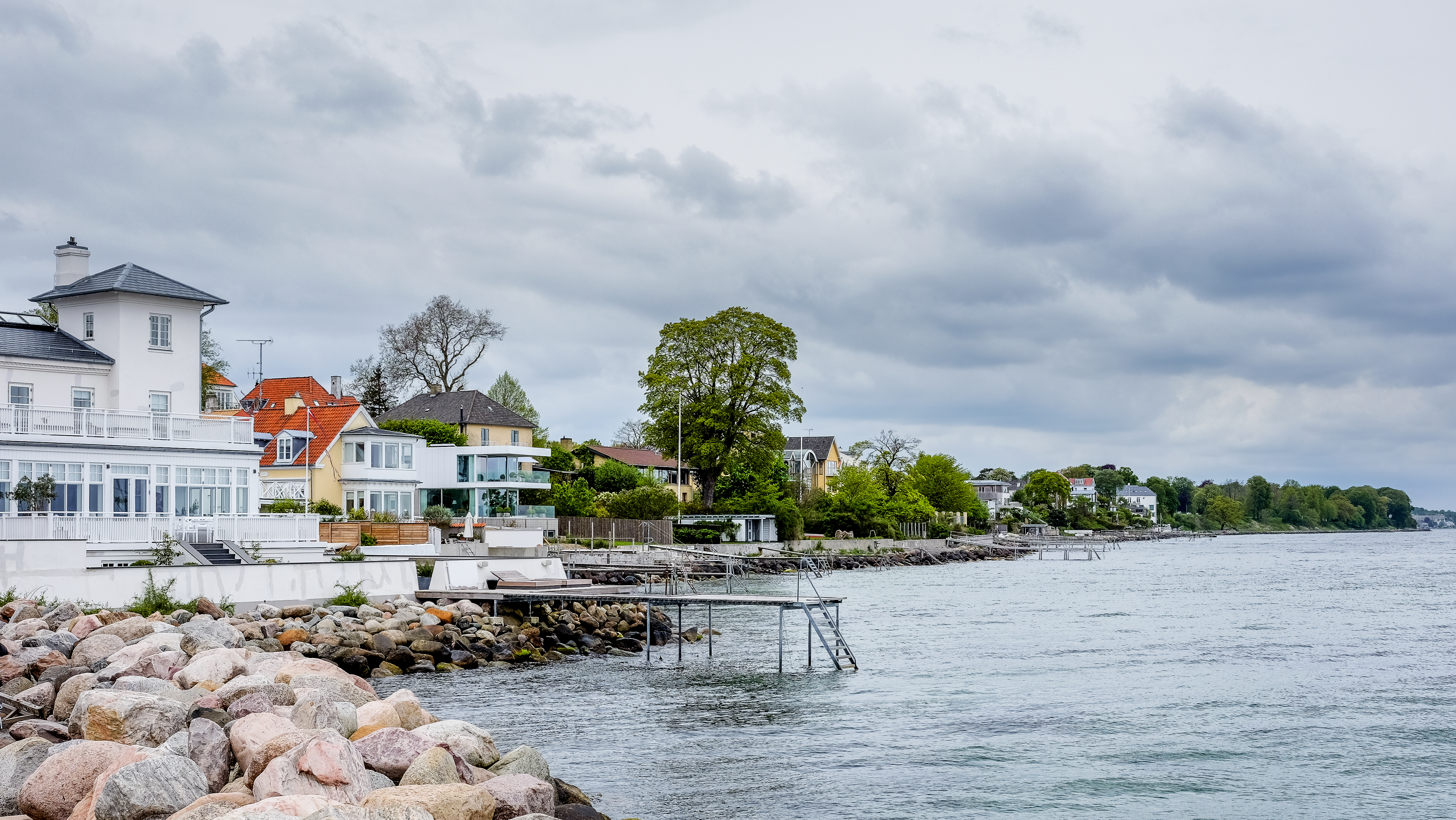
Villas in Taarbæk.

Taarbæk is a small town or neighbourhood located in the eastern part of the municipality. It borders the Øresund to the east and Jægersborg Dyrehave to the west. Klampenborg is located to the south. Although Taarbæk is technically connected to the Greater Copenhagen Area, and thus a neighbourhood of Copenhagen, it is in the outskirts of the Greater Copenhagen Area and is occasionally referred to as its own town. Taarbæk is a former fishing village, with many old fishing houses preserved. The neighbourhood is, however, dominated by high-end luxury villas. Taarbæk Church and Taarbæk Harbour are both located centrally in the neighbourhood.

=== Virum ===
Virum is a neighbourhood located in the north-western part of the municipality. It borders the lake of Furesø to the west. It borders the neighbourhood of Brede to the east, Frederiksdal to the south and Sorgenfri to the south and east. To the north it borders Holte in Rudersdal Municipality. Virum is primarily a residential neighbourhood. Virum Church is located in Virum.

=== Villages ===
There are few real villages in the municipality, though there are several small or isolated neighbourhoods. These villages and small neighbourhoods are listed below.

Bondebyen
Brede
Fortunen
Frederiksdal
Fuglevad
Kongens Lyngby Enghave

Ravnholm
Raadvad
Spring-forbi
Stampen
Strandmøllen
Ørholm

== Nature ==
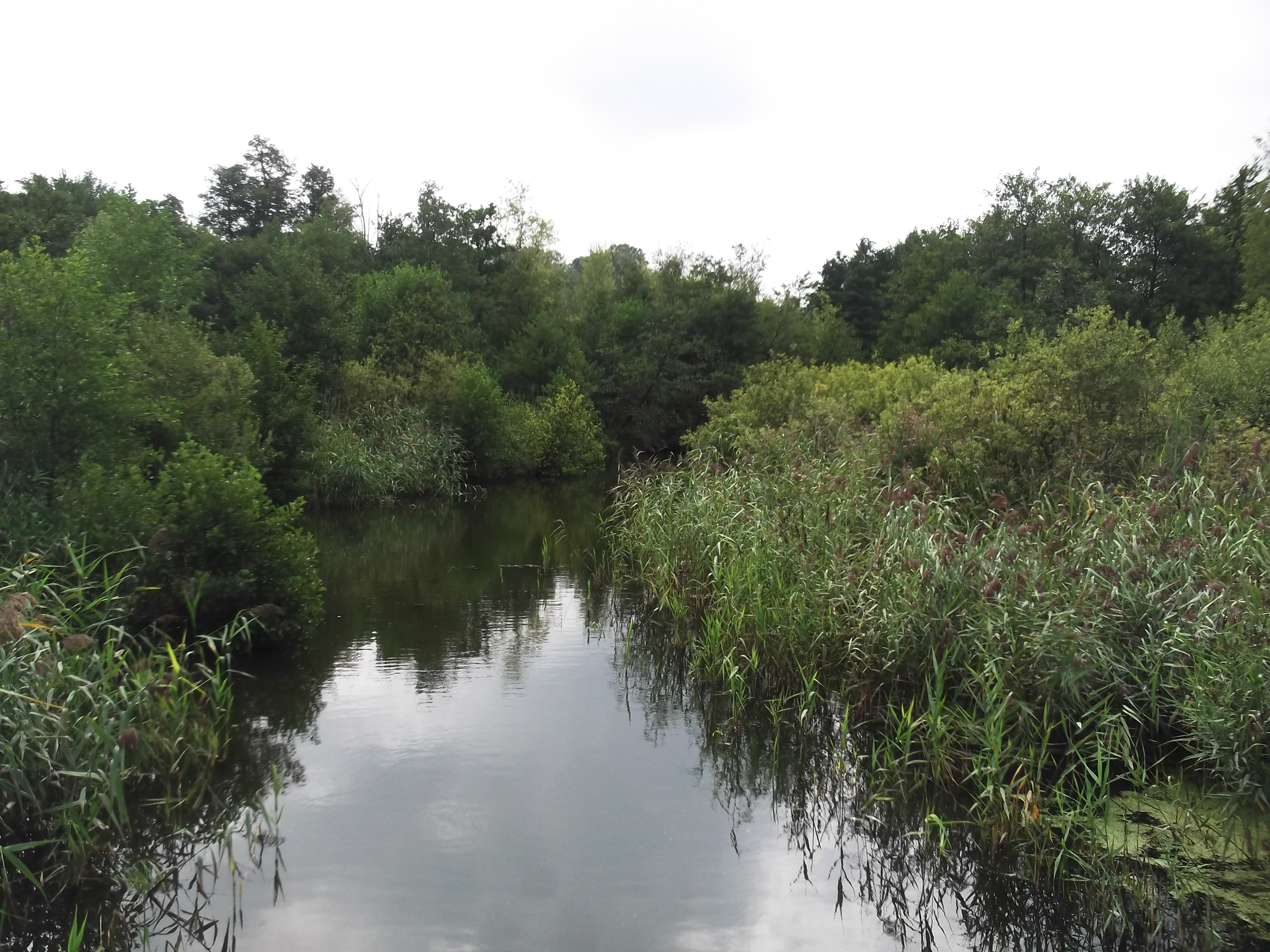
Mølleåen.

Cottageparken is a public park located by Taarbæk. It used to be a part of Jægersborg Dyrehave, with the oaks of the part dating back from 1763, when a number of oaks where planted in the park. The forest was cleared to make room for buildings, including a spa.

418 acres of land is protected around the stream Mølleåen, as well as areas around Lyngby Lake and Bagsværd Lake. Mølleåen is 36 km long and runs through the entire municipality from the coast and onwards to Bastrup Lake in Allerød and Egedal Municipality. Notable plants around the stream include marsh-marigold, yellow iris and water buttercup.

=== Jægersborg Dyrehave ===
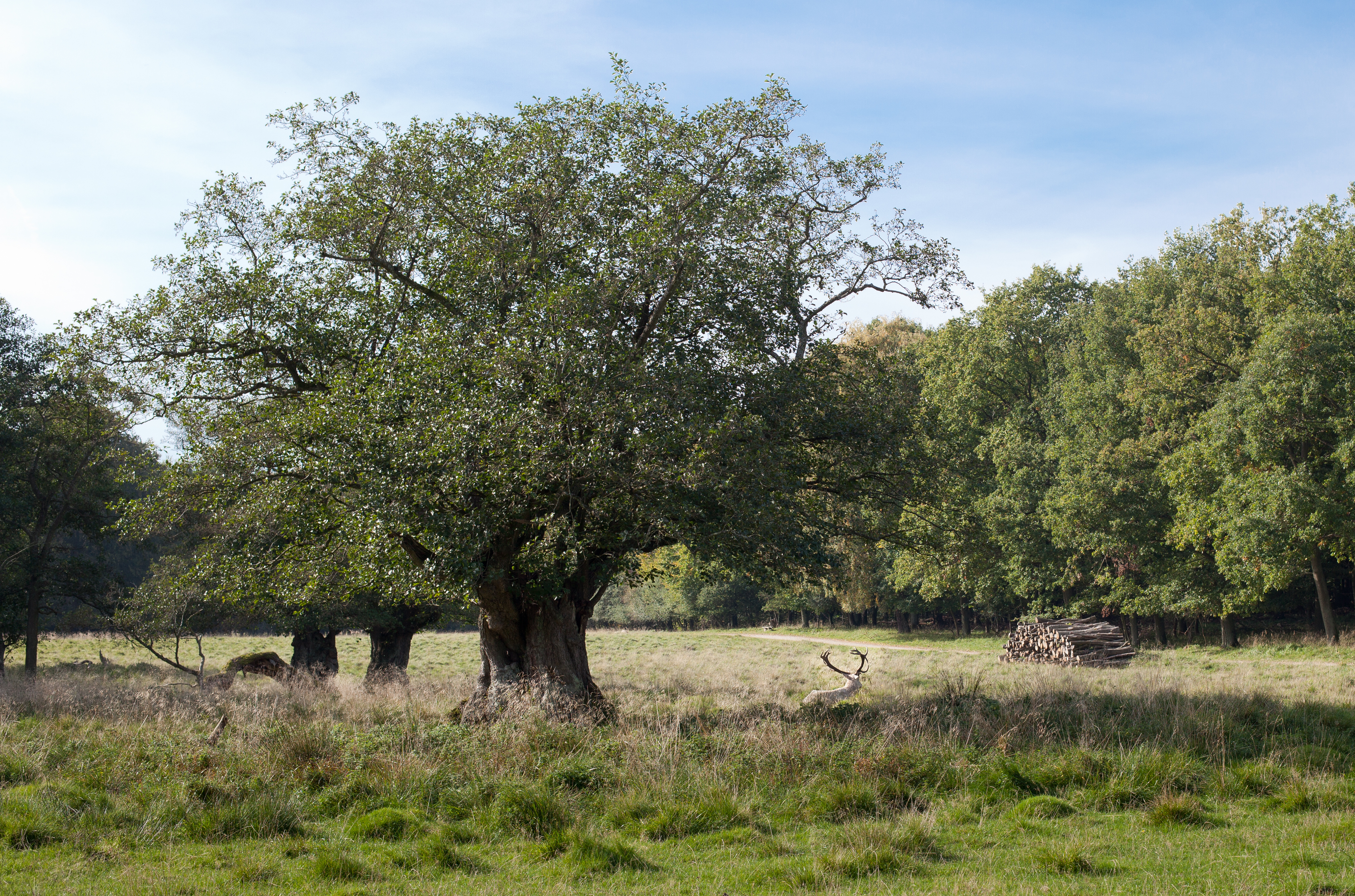
A deer under an oak tree in Jægersborg Dyrehave.

Jægersborg Dyrehave is a forest park located in the eastern part of Lyngby-Taarbæk Municipality, bordering Taarbæk to the east. The amusement park Dyrehavsbakken is located in the southern part of the park. The park spans 11 km^{2} and is home to around 2000 red and fallow deer. There are 19 gates to the park, all of them painted a characteristic red. The current design of the gates date back to the 1700s. The park is home to many old oaks, the oldest being around 850 years old and known as Skovfogedegen (literally "forest ranger oak"), named such because it is located next to the forest ranger house Klampehus. The oak is hollow, and has throughout history been used for many things, including church ceremonies and as a shed for peat. Another oak is named Christian V's Oak, named such because Christian V suffered his fatal hunting injury nearby, when he was kicked by a wounded deer. Another old oak is named Ulvedalsegen and is around 600—700 years old. The park is also home to hawthorn, most of it naturally occurring. In the park is a mass grave from the Black Death victims from the 1600s and 1700s. These graves have been planted with hawthorn.

Jægersborg Dyrehave is a UNESCO World Heritage Site, listed among the par force hunting landscape in North Zealand. The park was originally established as hunting grounds, for hunts with hounds. The paths of the park reflects this, with a star-shaped path system, that would allow the hunters a better view of the hunting dogs.

The Hermitage Hunting Lodge is located centrally in the park. It is a former hunting lodge used to host royal banquets after hunts in Dyrehaven. It was built in 1734-36 by architect Lauritz de Thurah.

== Politics ==
=== Municipal council ===
Lyngby-Taarbæk's municipal council consists of 21 members, elected every four years.

Below are the municipal council elected since the municipality's creation in 1970.

Election	Party												Total seats	Turnout	Elected mayor
Election	A	B	C	F	I	K	O	V	Y	Z	Ø	...	Total seats	Turnout	Elected mayor
1970	6	2	10	1									19		Paul Fenneberg (C)
1974	6	1	7	2		1		1		3			21		Ole Harkjær (C)
1978	6	1	10	1					1	1		1	21		Ole Harkjær (C)
1981	6	1	10	1				1	2				21		Ole Harkjær (C)
1985	6	1	10	2				1	1				21		Ole Harkjær (C)
1989	5	1	10	2				1		1		1	21		Kai Aage Ørnskov (C)
1993	5	1	8	2				4				1	21		Kai Aage Ørnskov (C)
1997	5	1	8	2			1	4					21		Kai Aage Ørnskov (C)
2001	5	1	7	2			1	5					21		Rolf Aagaard-Svendsen (C)
2005	5	2	7	2			1	4					21	68.6%	Rolf Aagaard-Svendsen (C)
2009	4	2	4	4			1	6					21	68.2%	Søren P. Rasmussen (V)
2013	5	1	5	2	1		1	5			1		21	74.0%	Sofia Osmani (C)
2017	4	2	10	2				2			1		21	72.9%	Sofia Osmani (C)
Data from Kmdvalg.dk, Statistikbanken.dk and editions of Kommunal Aarbog

=== Mayors ===
Since the 1970 Danish Municipal Reform, the mayors of Lyngby-Taarbæk Municipality have been:

#	Mayor	Party	Term
1	Paul Fenneberg	Conservative People's Party	1970–1973
2	Ole Harkjær	Conservative People's Party	1973–1987
3	Kai Aage Ørnskov	Conservative People's Party	1987–2001
4	Rolf Aagaard-Svendsen	Conservative People's Party	2001–2010
5	Søren P. Rasmussen	Venstre	2010–2013
6	Sofia Osmani	Conservative People's Party	2013–present

== Economy ==
The largest industries in Lyngby-Taarbæk Municipality, by number of employees, are education, retail and counselling. Consulting companies in the municipality include Alectia and COWI.

Companies with their headquarters in the municipality include investment company DADES, one of the largest one of the largest private property investment companies in Denmark. DDC-I is a software development company, also with their headquarter located in Lyngby-Taarbæk Municipality. Also located in the municipality are coating supplier Hempel and porcelain factory Porcelænsfabrikken Danmark. Catalysis company Haldor Topsøe also have their headquarter in the municipality. Catalysts by Haldor Topsøe are used in production of around 50% of the world's fertilizer.

== Demographics ==
Historical population
Year	Pop.	±%
2008	51,449	—
2009	51,532	+0.2%
2010	52,237	+1.4%
2011	52,754	+1.0%
2012	53,251	+0.9%
2013	53,840	+1.1%
2014	54,237	+0.7%
2015	54,778	+1.0%
2016	55,097	+0.6%
2017	55,240	+0.3%
2018	55,472	+0.4%
2019	55,790	+0.6%
2020	56,214	+0.8%
2021	56,614	+0.7%
Source: Statistikbanken.dk

There are 56,614 people living in Lyngby-Taarbæk Municipality (2021). 50.78% are women and 49.22% are men. 81.46% of the municipality are members of the Church of Denmark.

Below is the age distribution of the municipality.

Age
1. 0–5 (6.00%)
2. 6–17 (15.2%)
3. 18–35 (21.7%)
4. 36–64 (37.3%)
5. 64+ (19.7%)

== Education ==
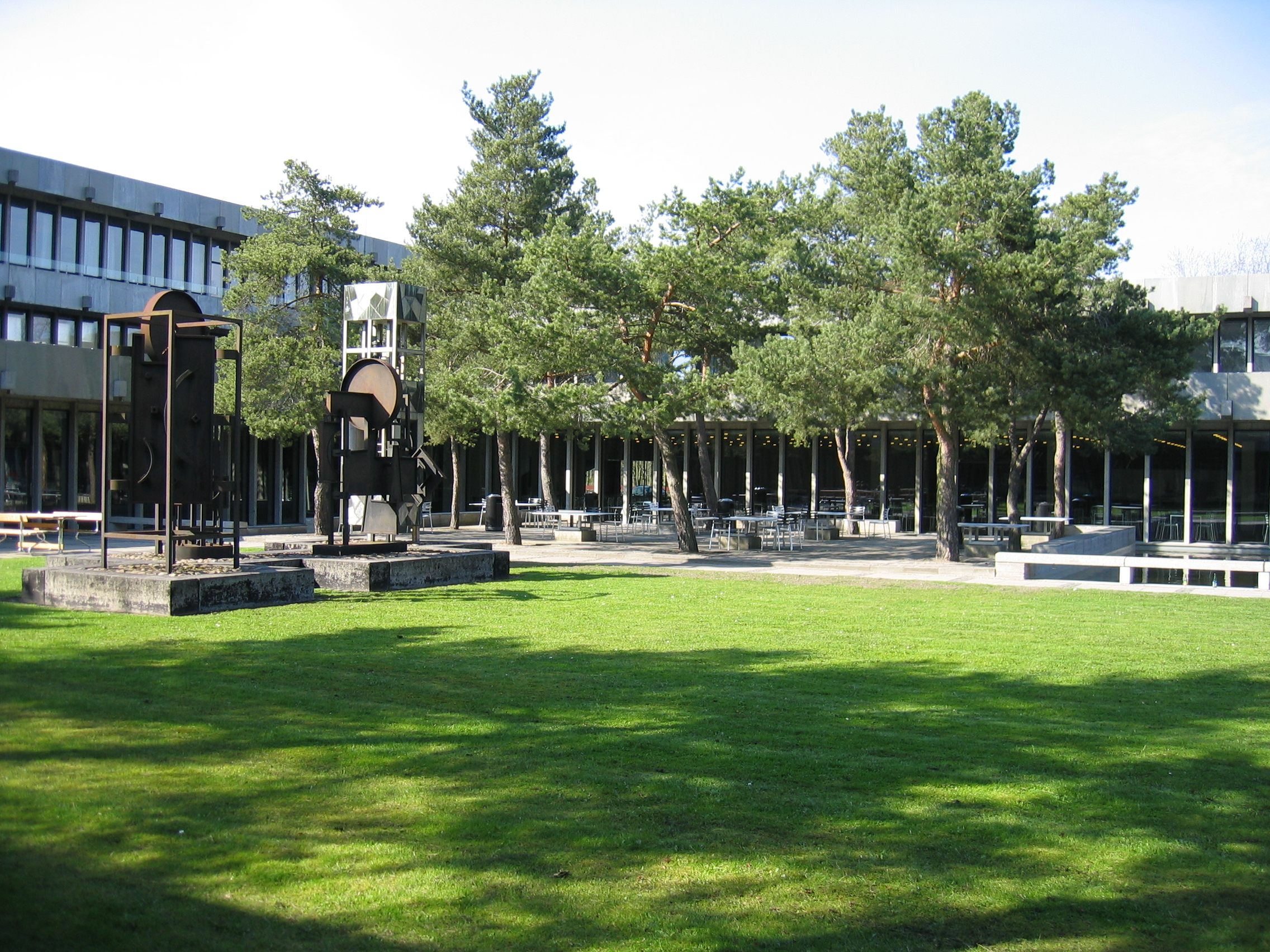
Technical University of Denmark in Lyngby.

There are 9 ground schools, 1 efterskole and 4 independent schools in the municipality, as well as 1 youth school and 2 special schools. The municipality also has a nature school, with available facilities for the schools in the municipality.

There is also 2 gymnasium, 1 technical gymnasium, 1 media school and 1 music school. One of the gymnasiums is part of the Copenhagen North Business College, which also offers vocational educations. Also located in the municipality are several schools of higher education: Cphbusiness Lyngby, Copenhagen's Engineer School (Danish: Københavns Maskinmesterskole) and the Technical University of Denmark. Departments of the Technical University of Denmark located in Lyngby-Taarbæk include the departments of Mathematics, Micro- and Nanotechnology and Veterinary Science.

There are 3 libraries in the municipality. One is located in Lyngby, one in Taarbæk and one in Virum.

== Transport ==
The S-train network connects Lyngby-Taarbæk Municipality with the rest of the Greater Copenhagen area. The B and E S-trains both service in the municipality, with both making stops at Lyngby station. Both of these lines are part of the Nordbanen rail lines. The B-line opened in 1936 and the E-line in 1968. A local train line, the Nærum Line, connects Jægersborg station in Hillerød Municipality to areas in Lyngby-Taarbæk Municipality and onward to Nærum in Rudersdal Municipality.

== Sights ==
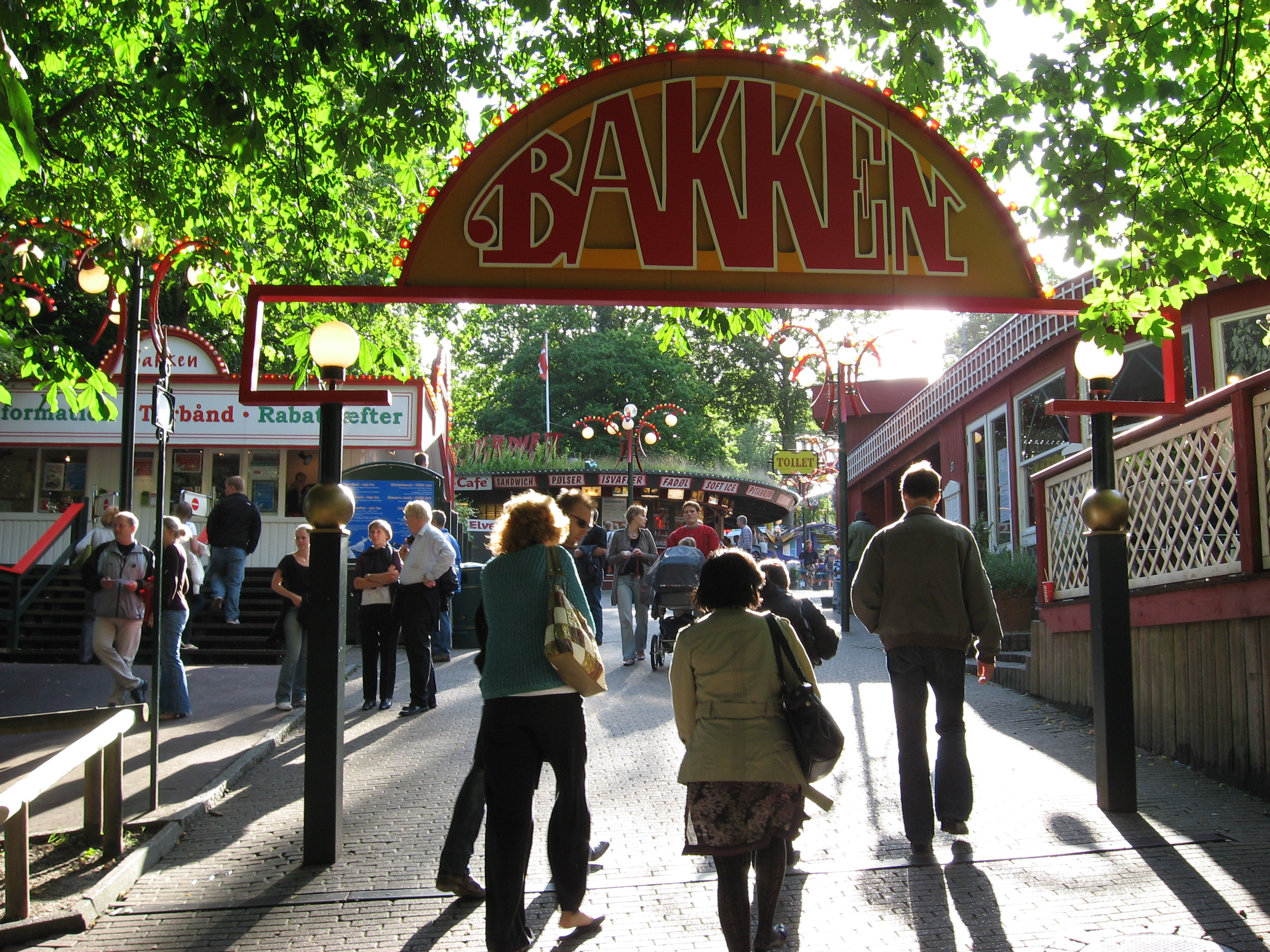
Entrance to Dyrehavsbakken

The historic Jægersborg Dyrehave in the municipality, means that there are several historic buildings in the municipality.

- Dyrehavsbakken is an amusement park located by Jægersborg Dyrehave. It is the second largest tourist attraction in Denmark, the first being the Tivoli Gardens. Unlike Tivoli, admission is free in Dyrehavsbakken. It opened in 1583 and is the world's oldest operating amusement park. The origins of the park are said to come from a young girl named Kirsten Piil, who in 1583 found a natural spring in Jægersborg Dyrehave. This spring attracted people from Copenhagen and eventually gathered large crowds, which attracted entertainers, causing the foundation of the amusement park.
- Frilandsmuseet is an open-air museum located in Sorgenfri. It was founded in 1897, but moved to Sorgenfri already in 1901 where founder Bernhard Olsen bought 12 acres of land. It portrayed Danish folklore and stories in authentic surroundings, which it still does today. The museum's collection consists of around 50,000 items.
- Brede Works (Danish: Brede Værk) is a museum under the National Museum of Denmark. It is an industrial museum, and the largest protected industrial area in Denmark. Also part of the museum is Brede House, the main building originally used by the owner of Brede Works.
- Frieboeshvile is a country house located in Kongens Lyngby. Its most notable former resident was German diplomat Georg Ferdinand Duckwitz. The house was built in 1756 by August Gynther. The building acts as a museum today.
- Fæstningskanalen is a canal, built in 1887—88 as part of the Copenhagen fortifications. The maintenance of the canal is taken care of by a community known as 'Fæstningskanalens Venner' (The Friends of Fæstingskanalen).

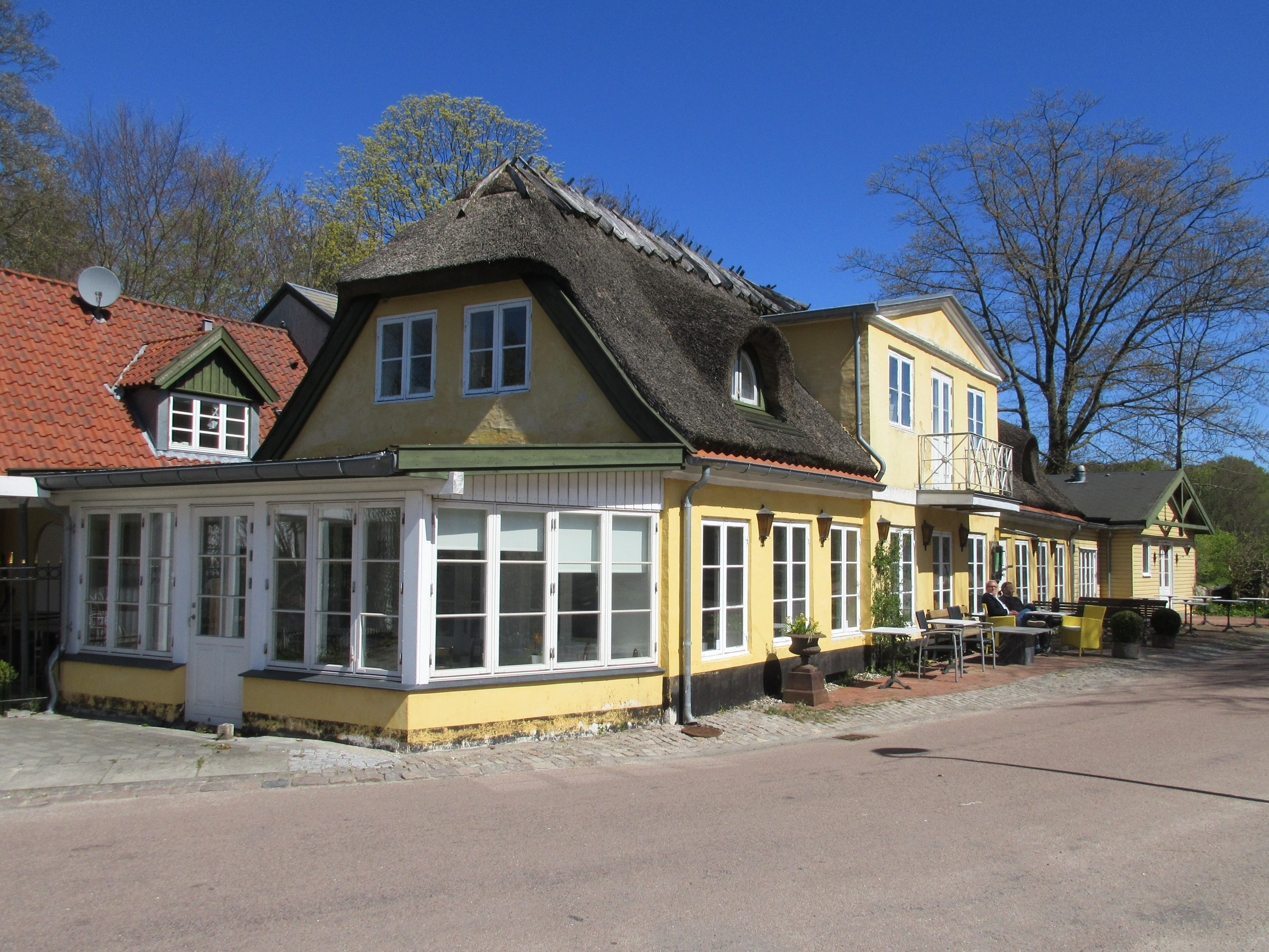
Lottenborg

- Lottenborg is an inn located in Sorgenfri. The building originates from the 1700s, where the town's gatekeeper (Danish: vangemanden) lived, which gave the house the nickname 'the Gatekeeper's House' (Danish: Vangehuset). The gatekeeper worked on the royal Sorgenfri Castle, and when Princess Charlotte was born in 1789 and the house was renamed to Lottenborg in her honour. Lottenberg eventually became a popular inn, and worked as inn and restaurant for many years. After the death of the owner in 1993, the house was willed to Lyngby-Taarbæk Municipality. It was put on sale in 2010 and sold in 2011.
- Lyngby Storcenter is a mall located in Kongens Lyngby. It first opened in 1973 and underwent a major renovation in 2003. The mall spans 31,000 m^{2} with over 100 different stores.
- Lyngby Stadium is a football and athletics stadium located in Kongens Lyngby. It was built in 1949 and renovated in 2013. It has a capacity of approximately 10,000, though at its audience peak it seated 14,794 people in 1991. The stadium is owned by the municipality.

=== Castles & Manors ===
- Frederiksdal is a manor house located south of Virum and west of Sorgenfri. It used to be a part of Hjortholm castle, which came under the crown in 1536. Hjortholm was eventually dissolved as an entity, but the land remained under the king until 1668 where Frederik III built a castle. This castle remained as a royal house until Christian VI gave it to his advisor Johan Sigismund Schulin in 1739. The manor has been owned by the Schulin family since. Johan Sigismund Schulin built the current main building in 1744–1747. The manor owns 269 acres, split between 72 acres of agriculture and 197 acres of forest.
- Sophienholm is a former manor house and a current exhibition venue, located south of Virum. It was built in 1768 by Theodorus Holmskiold. In 1963 it was given to Lyngby-Taarbæk Parish Municipality (Danish: Lyngby-Taarbæk Sognekommune). Today it displays art exhibitions all year round.

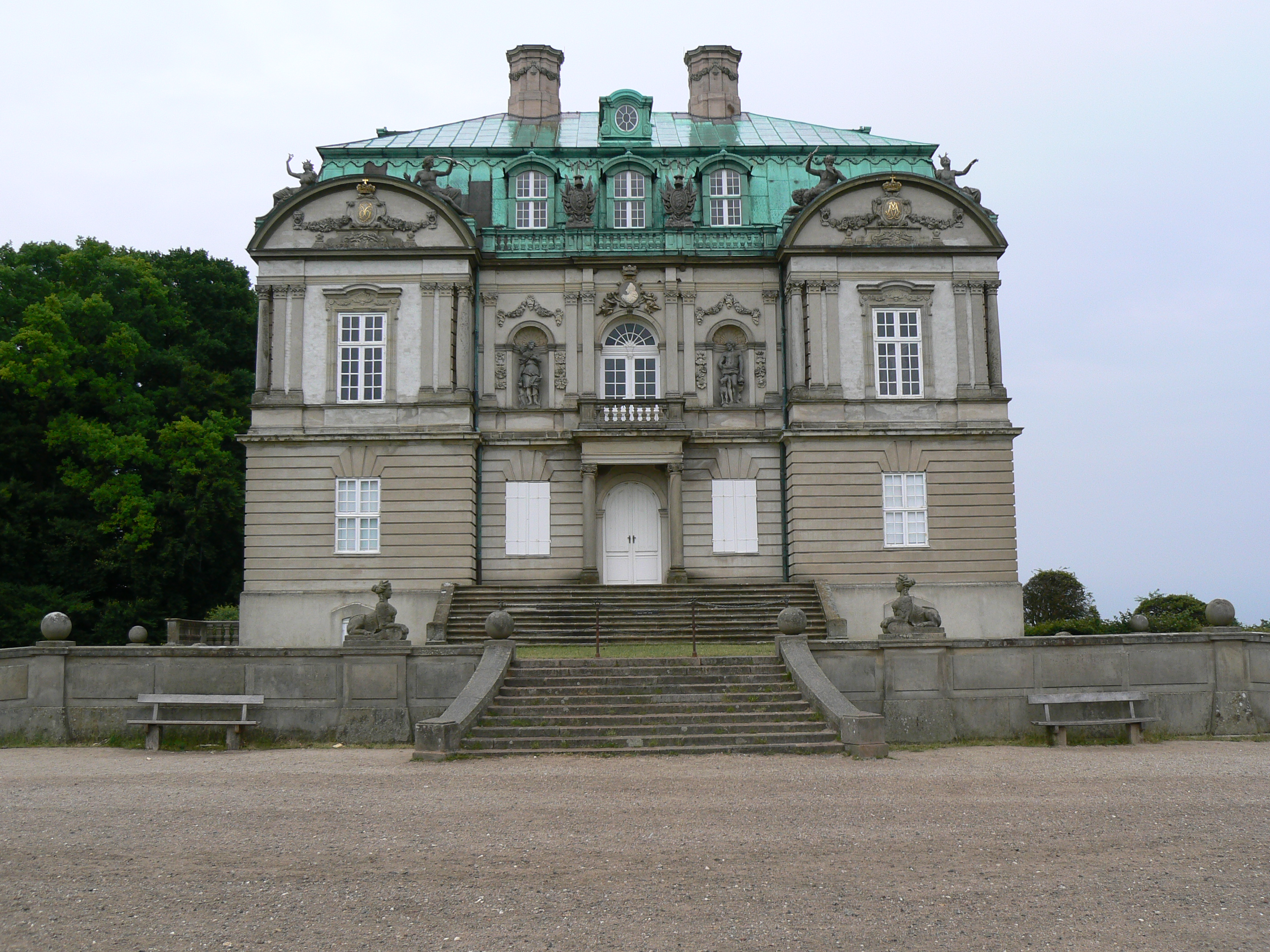
Hermitage Hunting Lodge

- Hermitage Hunting Lodge (Danish: Eremitageslottet) is a former hunting lodge located in Jægersborg Dyrehave. The hunting lodge used to host royal banquets after hunts in Jægersborg Dyrehave. It was built in 1734-36 by architect Lauritz de Thurah. Another house previously stood at location of the hunting lodge, with Christian V constructing a lodge in 1694. It was torn down in 1734 to build the current lodge. Carpenter Johan Jeremias Reusse built a construction in 1736, allowing the dining room table to be lowered down into the kitchen below. The construction was removed at the end of the 1700s. The hunting lodge underwent restorations in 1979–1991, and has hosted numerous royal banquets. It is available to the current royal family, and the queen hosts dinners at the hunting lodge.
- Sorgenfri Palace is a castle located north of Kongens Lyngby, south of Brede and east of Sorgenfri. The first castle on the location was built in 1705–1706 by François Dieussart for Carl Greve Ahlefeldt. From 1730 it has been owned by the crown and royal family. The castle was rebuilt in 1756–1757 and was expanded again in 1791–1794. Frederik VII gave the castle to the Danish state, but it was given back to the royal family again in 1898. Much of the castle's gardens are open to the public.

=== Churches ===
See List of churches in Lyngby-Taarbæk Municipality

== Parishes ==
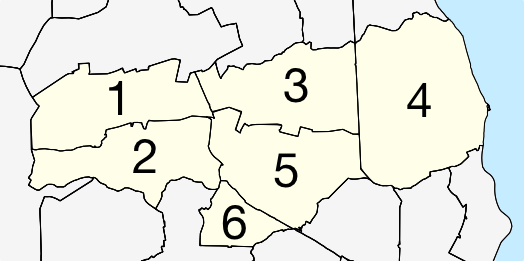
Parishes of Lyngby-Taarbæk Municipality.

There are 6 parishes in Lyngby-Taarbæk Municipality. Shown in the table below are the populations of each parish, as well as the percentage of that population that are members of the Church of Denmark. All numbers are from 1 January 2021.

#	Parish	Population	%	Source
1	Virum	11,522	71.73	
2	Sorgenfri	6,528	72.64	
3	Lundtofte	13,516	65.33	
4	Taarbæk	1,600	73.13	
5	Kongens Lyngby	13,983	63.06	
6	Christians	9,300	67.61	

== Symbols ==
The coat of arms of Lyngby-Taarbæk Municipality is two distinct coats of arms, always portrayed together. On the left is the coat of arms of Lyngby and on the right is the coat of arms of Taarbæk. The coat of arms was first used in 1916. The coat of arms of Lyngby is red with a grey wavy line going across the shield. This line represents the stream Mølleåen, and the three water mill wheels represent the place's history with water mills. Above the grey line is a bronze-coloured crown, referring to former crown lands in the area. Also on the coat of arms are three branches of heather (Danish: Lyng), from which the place has its name. The coat of arms of Taarbæk is blue with two silver oars crossing the center along with a boat hook and an eel trap, also portrayed in silver. The fishing equipment refers to the place's history with fishing in Øresund.

== Notable residents ==
=== Nobility ===
- Frederik IX of Denmark (1899 on Sorgenfri Palace — 1972), king of Denmark from 1947 to 1972
- Knud, Hereditary Prince of Denmark (1900 on Sorgenfri Palace — 1976), hereditary prince and former heir presumptive
- Ingolf of Rosenborg (born 1940 on Sorgenfri Palace), count

=== Public thought and politics ===
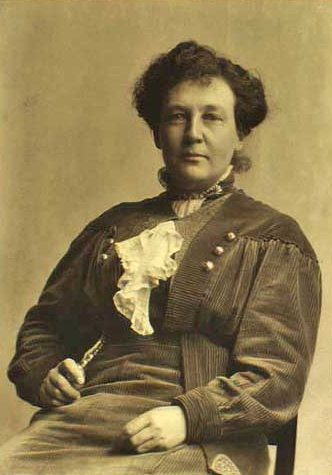
Ingrid Jespersen

- Vilhelm Theodor Walther (1819 in Kongens Lyngby – 1892), architect and building inspector
- Ingrid Jespersen (1867 in Kongens Lyngby – 1938), pedagogue and school principal
- Finn Thiesen (born 1941 in Kongens Lyngby), linguist, iranist, and translator
- Carsten Koch (born 1945 in Kongens Lyngby), former MF and minister
- Lise-Lotte Rebel (born 1951 in Kongens Lyngby), bishop and first woman bishop in the Church of Denmark
- Mads Tofte (born 1959 in Kongens Lyngby), computer scientist
- Stine Bosse (born 1960 in Virum), businesswoman
- Torsten Stiig Jansen (born 1963 in Virum), journalist and diplomat
- Henrik Sass Larsen (born 1966 in Virum), former MF and minister
- Daniel Toft Jakobsen (born 1978 in Kongens Lyngby), MF
- Sofia Osmani (born 1979 in Virum), politician and mayor
- Stinus Lindgreen (born 1980), MF

=== Art ===
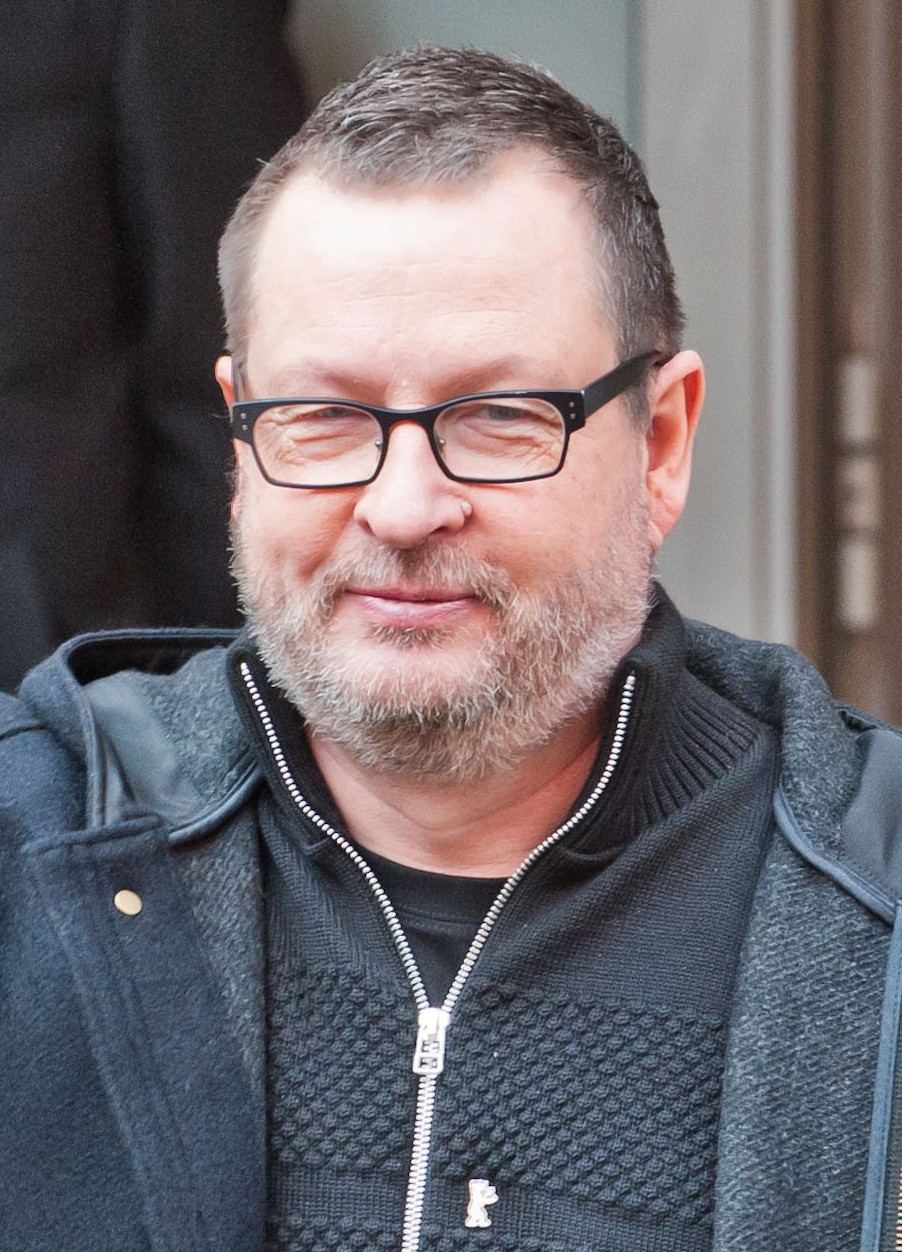
Lars von Trier

- Ida Brun (1792 on Sophienholm – 1857), singer, dancer and mime artist
- Ferdinand Richardt (1819 in Brede – 1895), artist and lithographer
- Elisa Marie Thornam (1857 in Kongens Lyngby – 1901), landscape painter and botanical illustrator
- Georg Jensen (1866 in Raadvad – 1935), silversmith and founder of Georg Jensen A/S
- Olga Wagner (1873 in Kongens Lyngby – 1963), painter and sculptor
- Karen Bramson (1875 in Taarbæk – 1936), author
- Dagmar Freuchen-Gale (1907 in Kongens Lyngby – 1991), illustrator, author and editor
- Kasper Heiberg (1928 in Kongens Lyngby – 1984), painter and sculptor
- Henning Moritzen (1928 in Taarbæk – 2012), actor
- Nina Pens Rode (1929 in Kongens Lyngby – 1992), actress
- Bille August (born 1948 in Brede), director, screenwriter, and cinematographer
- Kirsten Ortwed (born 1948 in Virum), artist and sculptor
- Hans Abrahamsen (born 1952 in Kongens Lyngby), composer
- Lars Haagensen (born 1953 in Sorgenfri), musicians and painter
- Lars von Trier (born 1956 in Kongens Lyngby), film director and screenwriter
- Søs Fenger (born 1961 in Kongens Lyngby), musician

=== Sport ===
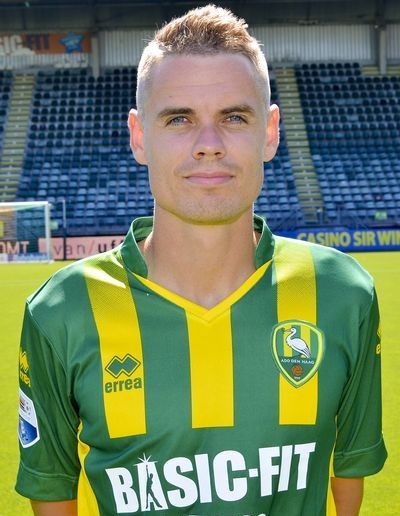
Thomas Kristensen

- Sofus Rose (1894 in Kongens Lyngby – 1974), long-distance runner
- Margot Bærentzen (1907 in Kongens Lyngby – 1983), fencer
- Erling Stuer Lauridsen (1916 in Kongens Lyngby – 2012), wrestler
- Johan Runge (1924 in Kongens Lyngby – 2005), weightlifter
- Helge Hansen (1925 in Kongens Lyngby – 2008), cyclist
- Ib Larsen (born 1945 in Kongens Lyngby), rower
- Jan Popiel (born 1947 in Virum), ice hockey player
- Marianne Halfdan-Nielsen (born 1956 in Virum), sailor
- Klaus Berggreen (born 1958 in Virum), footballer
- John Helt (born 1959 in Virum), footballer
- Henrik Larsen (born 1966 in Kongens Lyngby), footballer and football manager
- Morten Egeblad Christoffersen (born 1968 in Virum), windsurfer
- Berit Christoffersen (born 1973 in Virum), rower
- Jakob Piil (born 1973 in Virum, bicycle racer
- Mikkel Beckmann (born 1983 in Virum), footballer
- Thomas Kristensen (born 1983 in Virum), footballer
- Frederik Nielsen (born 1983 in Kongens Lyngby), tennis player
- Nabil Aslam (born 1984 in Kongens Lyngby), footballer
- Jeanette Ottesen (born 1987 in Kongens Lyngby), swimmer
- Mai Grage (born 1992 in Kongens Lyngby), tennis player
- Mikkel Basse (born 1996 in Virum), footballer
- Jacob Bruun Larsen (born 1998 in Kongens Lyngby), footballer
- Christian Rasmussen (born 2003 in Kongens Lyngby), footballer
