= Spring-forbi =

- Neighbourhood
- Location in the Capital Region of Denmark
- Coordinates: 55.80252°N 12.58470°E
- Country: Denmark
- Region: Capital Region
- Municipality: Lyngby-Taarbæk
- Time zone: UTC+1 (CET)
  - Summer (DST): UTC+2 (CEST)

Spring-forbi is a neighbourhood in Lyngby-Taarbæk Municipality, located north of Copenhagen. It is located north of Taarbæk and east of Jægersborg Dyrehave. The name is thought to originate from an inn located in Spring-forbi, the inn called Spring-ej-forbi (translation do not miss).
