= Bondebyen =

- Neighbourhood
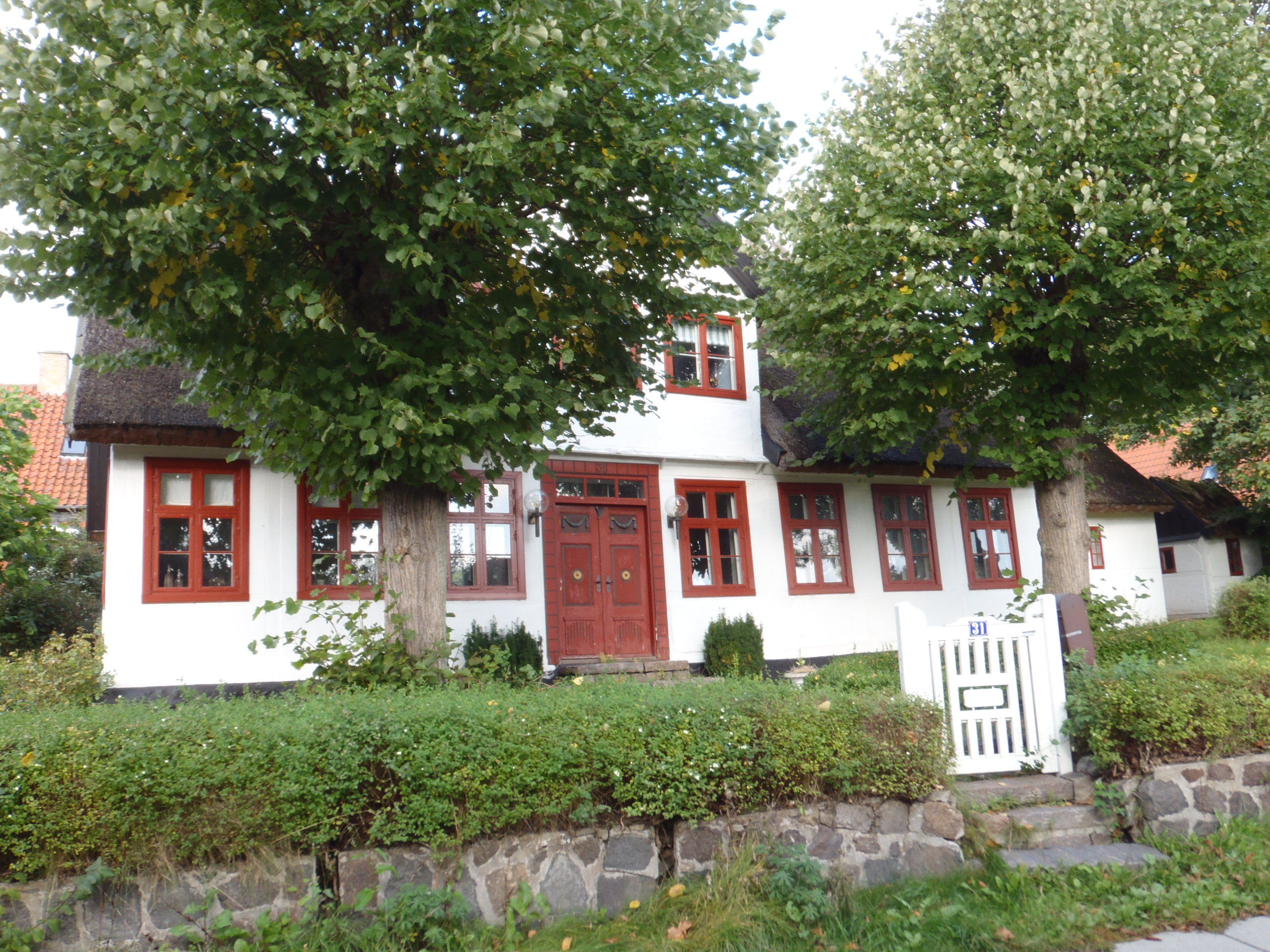
- Støvlet-Katrine's house

- Location in the Capital Region of Denmark
- Coordinates: 55°46′30″N 12°30′13″E
- Country: Denmark
- Region: Capital Region
- Municipality: Lyngby-Taarbæk
- Time zone: UTC+1 (CET)
  - Summer (DST): UTC+2 (CEST)

Bondebyen (Peasants' Town in Danish) is a historical neighbourhood of Kongens Lyngby. It is considered the best-preserved country town of the Copenhagen area, albeit it is now in the middle of the heavily urbanized Lyngby-Taarbæk municipality.

Among the notable buildings is the house of Støvlet-Cathrine, as well as Lindegaarden (Linden Farm), built between 1841–1883. Høstvej nr. 4, Vilhelminelyst, was Gyrithe Lemche's ancestral home. The known jurist Janus Kolderup-Rosenvinge lived in Høstvej nr. 6, and the merchant J. Fr. Tutein lived in Asylgade nr. 7.

The association Bondebylauget has worked since 1970 to preserve, improve and restore the area; its president, Niels Friderichsen, is generally recognized to have saved Bondebyen from destruction by Lyngby-Taarbæk municipality. Most of the buildings in Bondebyen are now listed.
