= Ørholm =

- Neighbourhood
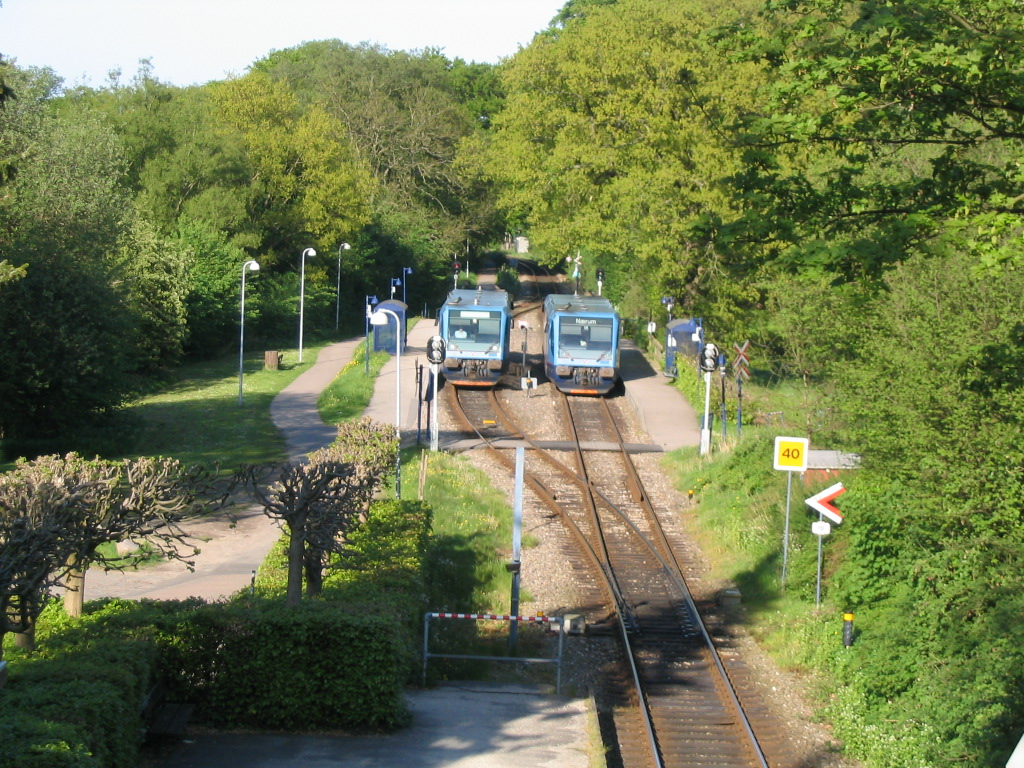
- Ørholm Station

- Location in the Capital Region of Denmark
- Coordinates: 55.8003°N 12.5057°E
- Country: Denmark
- Region: Capital Region
- Municipality: Lyngby-Taarbæk
- Time zone: UTC+1 (CET)
  - Summer (DST): UTC+2 (CEST)

Ørholm is a neighbourhood and locality on the Mølleåen river in Lyngby-Taarbæk Municipality in the northern suburbs of Copenhagen, Denmark. Ørholm Watermill has a history that dates back to at least the 15th century but the current industrial buildings were constructed after fires in 1886 and 1913. Ørholm House, a residence dating from the mid-18th century, is privately owned and heritage listed. Ørholm Station is located on the Nærum Railway and is served by the railway company Lokaltog.

== Ørholm Watermill ==
The watermill is mentioned in the Roskilde Bishop's Census Book (Roskildebispens Jordebog) from the 1370s as molendinum Ørewaz while the locality at this point was known as Ørevad. The suffix -vad means ford. The name Ørholm is first documented in 1670 in the form Øerholmen. The watermill was originally a grain mill but was adapted for use in the production of gunpowder in 1558. The mill was owned by the crown and was modernized in the 1620s with inspiration from the Netherlands.

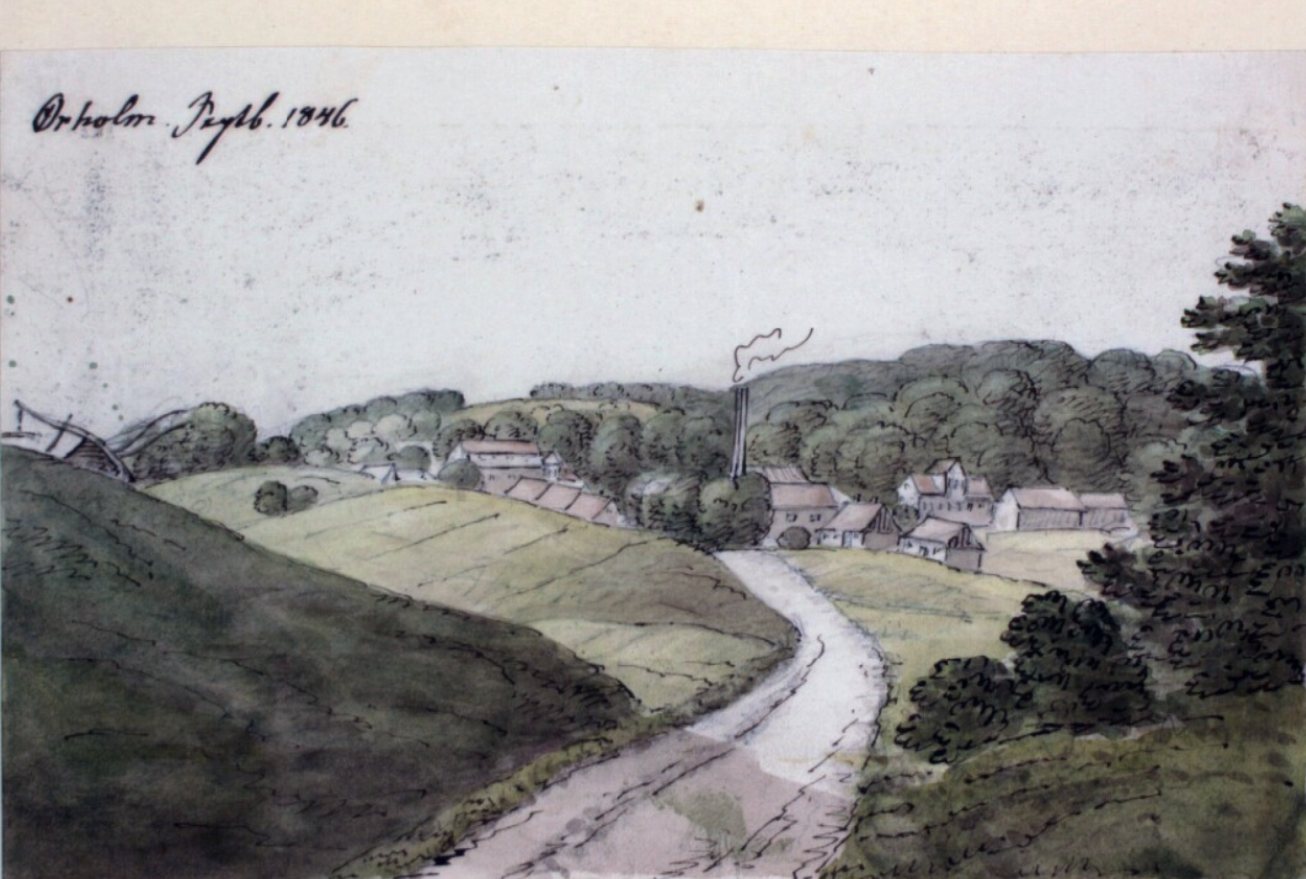
Ole Jørgen Rawert: Ørholm, September 1846

In 1653, Ørholm was sold to Herman Isenberg. He was obliged to provide the state with all needed supplies of gunpowder but could also sell to private customers. The gunpowder was stored in a gunpowder magazine at Copenhagen's Nørreport city gate and was for instance used in the defence of the city during the Assault on Copenhagen The watermill changed several times over the next fifty years. Albrecht Heins, who also owned Lundtofte, owned Ørholm from 1670–72. Peder Griffenfeld, who was a personal friend of Heins as well as of several of the other owners, was a frequent visitor to the place. In 1716, an explosion resulted in the death of two workers and the loss of 300 kg of gunpowder.

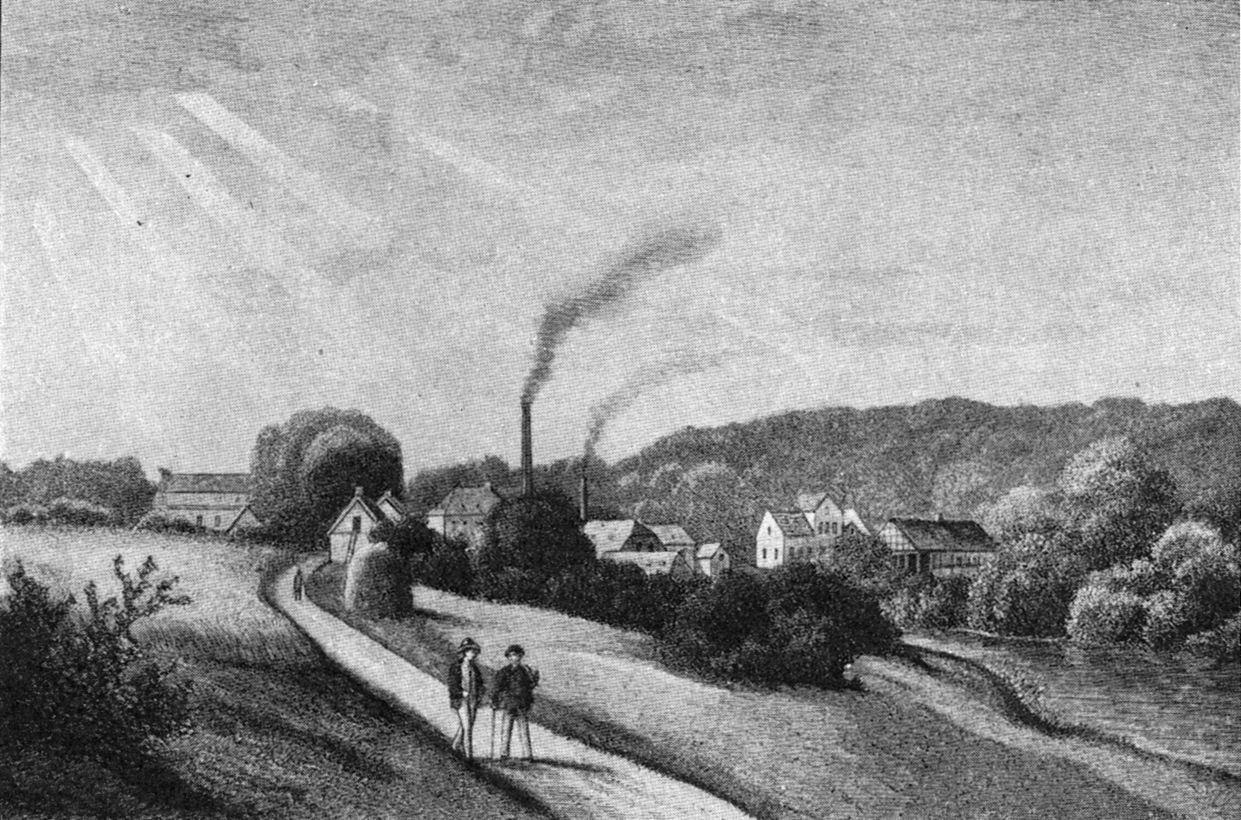
Ørholm in 1860

In 1724, Ørholm was acquired by royal coppersmith Poul Badstuber who already owned the operations at Brede and Nymølle. He adapted Ørholm for use in the production of copper and iron goods. In 1742, Badstuber had to sell Ørholm in auction. The buyer was

In 1793, two Englishmen, Henry Nelthropp and John Joseph Harris, converted the factory into a paper mill which mainly produced print paper, wallpaper and blue wrapping paper.

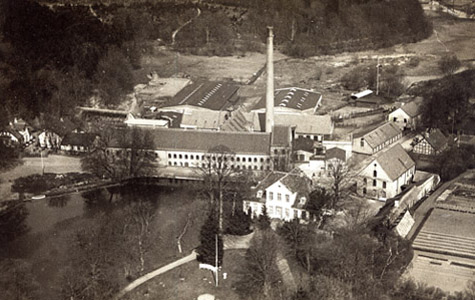
Ørholm Mill in 1920

The following year they expanded their business with the acquisition of Nymølle. From 1830 the company was in decline due to the competition from the much larger paper manufacturer Strandmøllen further downstream. In 1854, Ørholm and Nymølle were sold to the owners of Strandmøllen and became part of a Danish de facto paper monopoly. The operations at Ørholm was modernized with the introduction of steam power and water turbines. Production of paper ceased in 1922. Lama, a manufacturer of wollen og wollen blankets and spring mattress, was based at Ørholm from 1930 until 1977. The buildings were then purchased by the state and is now used by National Museum as a storage.

== Ørholm House ==
Ørholm House (Danish: Ørholm Hovedgård) was built as a residence for the director of the factory. The architect or exact time of construction is unknown but it is assumed that it was built for Lauritz Stubs since it is known that he applied for permission to transport a large load of bricks through Jægersborg Dyrehave in 1753.

When Ørholm was merged with Strandmøllen by J.C. Drewsen & Sønner in 1854, the need for the building disappeared and it was instead rented out. The first tenant was the officer and politician Anton Frederik Tscherning, who had served as Denmark's first Minister of Defence after the adoption of the Constitution in 1849, and who lived in it with his wife, the painter and writer Eleonora Tscherning. From 1866, Christian Drewsen's daughter Ophelia took over the house, together with her husband, the National Liberal editor Godske Nielsen. The house has later changed hands many times. One of the later owners was Paul Fenneberg, a former mayor of Lyngby Taarbæk, who owned the house 1933–1982.

== Ørholm Station ==
Ørholm Station is located on the Nærum Railway and is served by the railway company Lokaltog.
