= Rolf Aagaard-Svendsen =

Danish politician

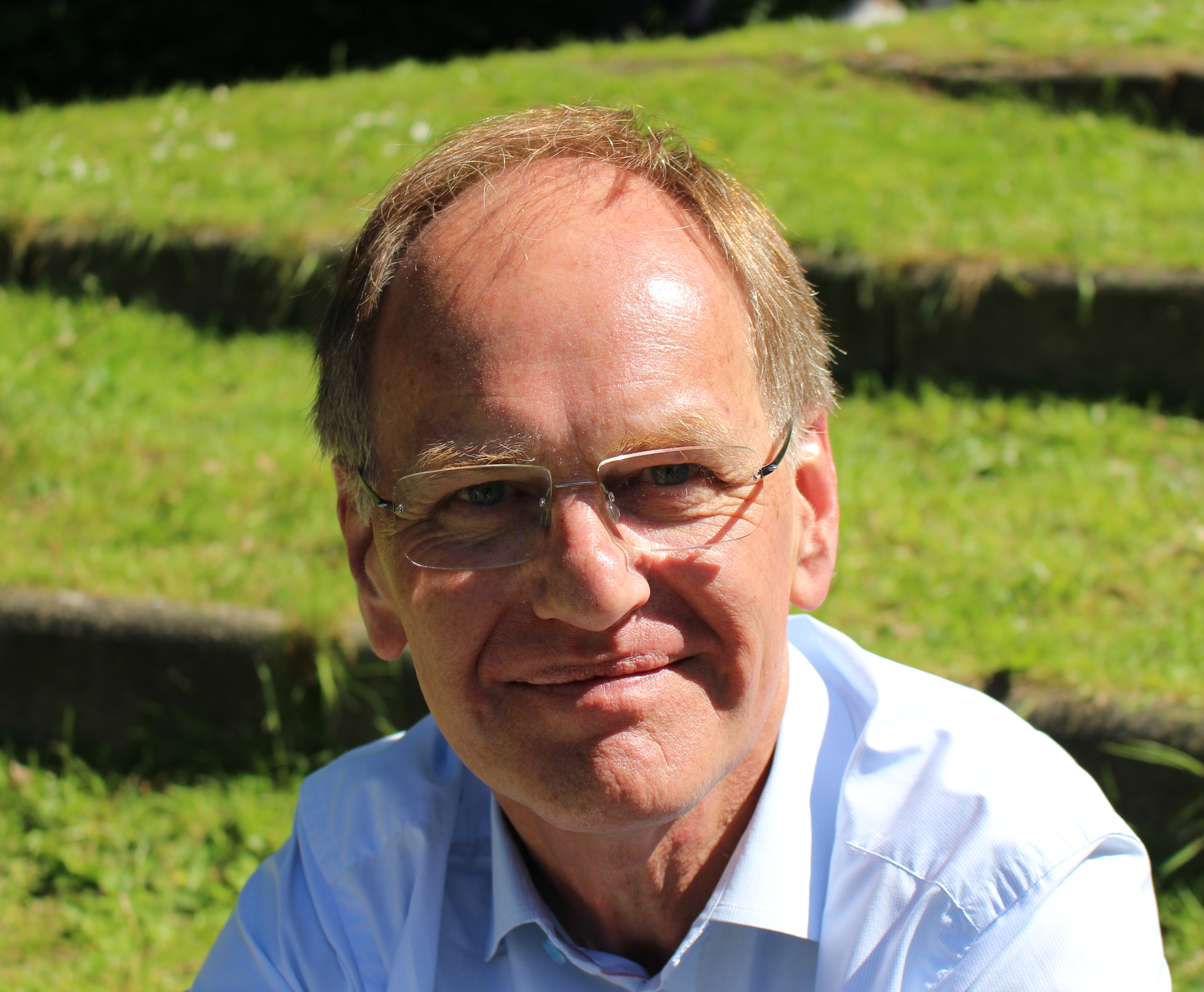

Mayor of Lyngby-Taarbæk Municipality
- In office 1 January 2002 – 31 December 2009
- Preceded by: Kai Aage Ørnskov (C)
- Succeeded by: Søren P. Rasmussen (C)

Personal details
- Born: 28 March 1948 (age 78) Hellerup, Denmark
- Party: Conservative People's Party

Rolf Aagaard-Svendsen (born 28 March 1948 in Hellerup) is a Danish politician, who served as mayor of Lyngby-Taarbæk Municipality from 2002 to 2010, elected for Conservative People's Party. He was first elected into municipal council in 1982.
