= Søren P. Rasmussen =

Danish politician

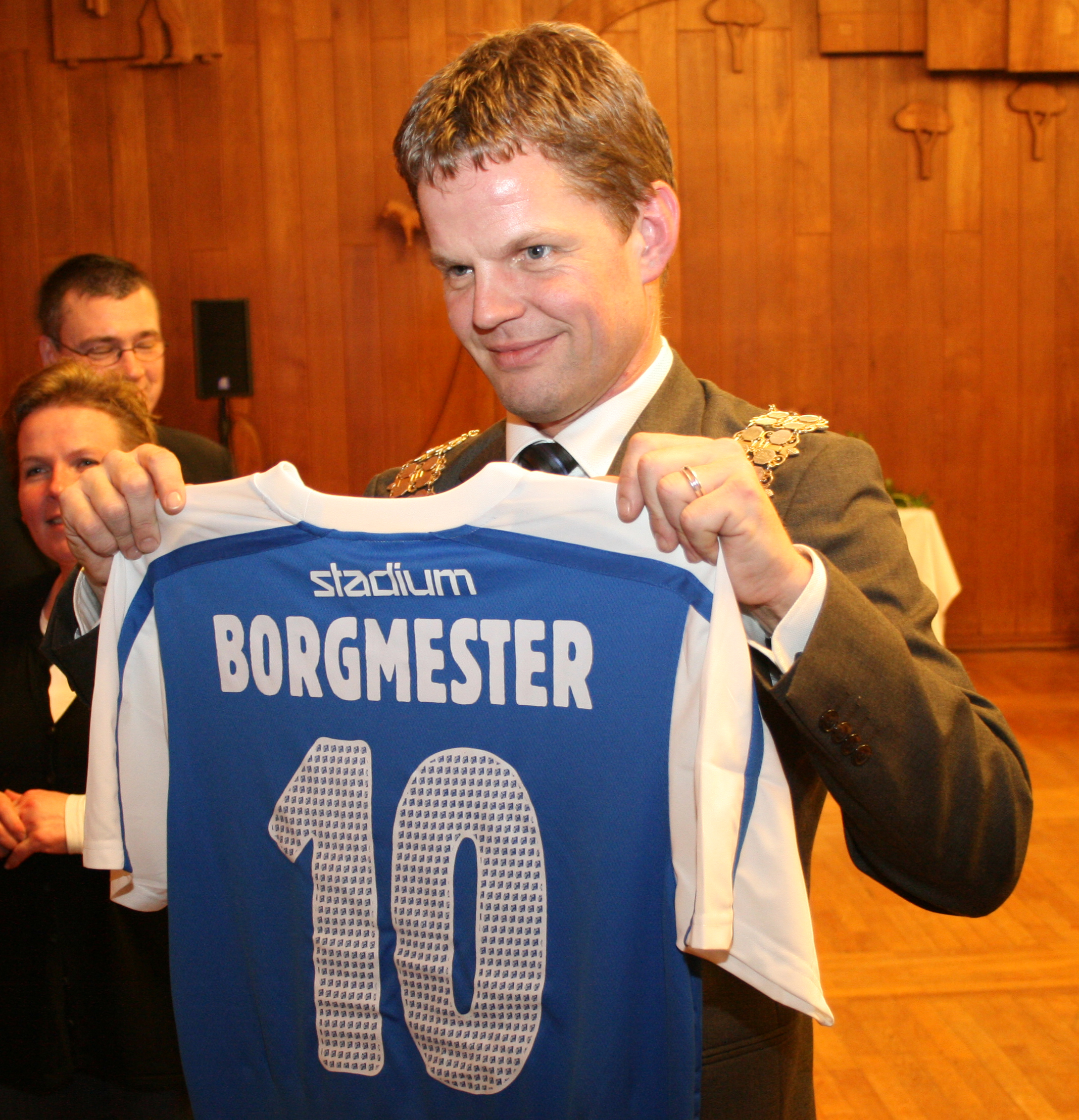

Mayor of Lyngby-Taarbæk Municipality
- In office 1 January 2010 – 31 December 2013
- Preceded by: Rolf Aagaard-Svendsen (C)
- Succeeded by: Sofia Osmani (C)

Personal details
- Born: 6 August 1967
- Party: Venstre

Søren P. Rasmussen (born 6 August 1967) is a Danish politician, who served as mayor of Lyngby-Taarbæk Municipality from 2010 to 2013, elected for Venstre. He was first elected into Lyngby-Taarbæk's municipal council in 2000, and remained on the council until 26 June 2020, where he moved to France.
