= Copenhagen North Business College =

Tertiary Institution

Knord
- Type: Secondary education
- Established: 1 January 2005
- Rector: René Van Laer (2017)
- Administrative staff: c. 325
- Students: 3.000 (2017)
- Location: North Zealand, Denmark
- Website: www.knord.dk

Copenhagen North Business College, also known as Lnord (formerly København Nord), is an institution of secondary education in the northern part of Greater Copenhagen, Denmark. It operates three campuses in Kongens Lyngby, Hillerød and Frederikssund and offers educational programmes in business and management on a secondary level to post-primary youth, Higher Commercial Examination Programme (HHX), and supplementary courses for adults seeking to maintain qualifications.

Knord is an independent self-owning institution under the Danish state, managed by a board composed of members from the business community in conjunction with a CEO and rectors of the individual schools that oversees day-to-day operations.

== History ==
København Nord was established on 1 January 2005 through the merger of Hillerød Handelsskole and Lyngby Uddannelsescenter Institutionen. On 1 August 2016, ts name was officially changed from København Nord to Knord.

== Campuses ==
=== Knord Lyngby ===
Knord has a total of around 1,600 students in Lyngby. The Lyngby campus comprises Lyngby Business College as well as the high school Lyngby Gymnasium.

=== Knord Hillerød ===
Knord Hillerød was established on 1. January 2000. >The campus is located at Trollesmindeallé 24. Gillerød Business College has around 700 students.

=== Knord Frederikssund ===
Knord has around 350 students in Frederikssund.
