= Lundtofte =

- Neighbourhood
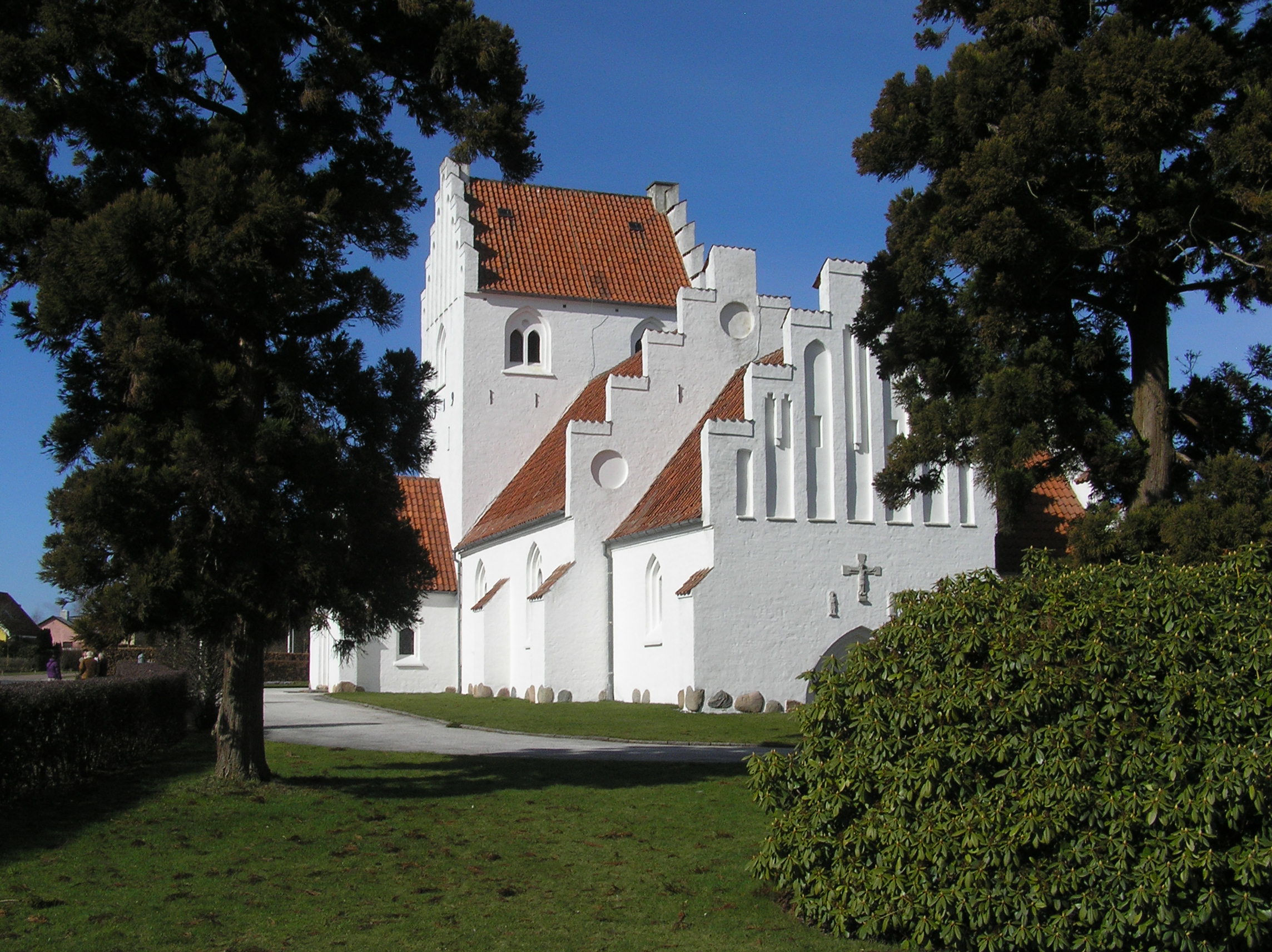
- Lundtofte Church

- Location in the Capital Region of Denmark
- Coordinates: 55°47′55″N 12°31′27″E
- Country: Denmark
- Region: Capital Region
- Municipality: Lyngby-Taarbæk
- Time zone: UTC+1 (CET)
  - Summer (DST): UTC+2 (CEST)

Lundtofte is a neighbourhood in Lyngby-Taarbæk Municipality, located north of Kongens Lyngby. The town is bordered by Nærumbanen, the Mølleåen river, the Technical University of Denmark and the Helsingørmotorvejen. DTU is situated on the location of the former Lundtofte Flyveplads.

Major company Haldor Topsøe is located in Lundtofte. Catalysts by Haldor Topsøe are used in production of around 50% of the world's fertilizer.

Lundtofte Church originates from 1921.
