= Farum Lake =

Lake in Denmark

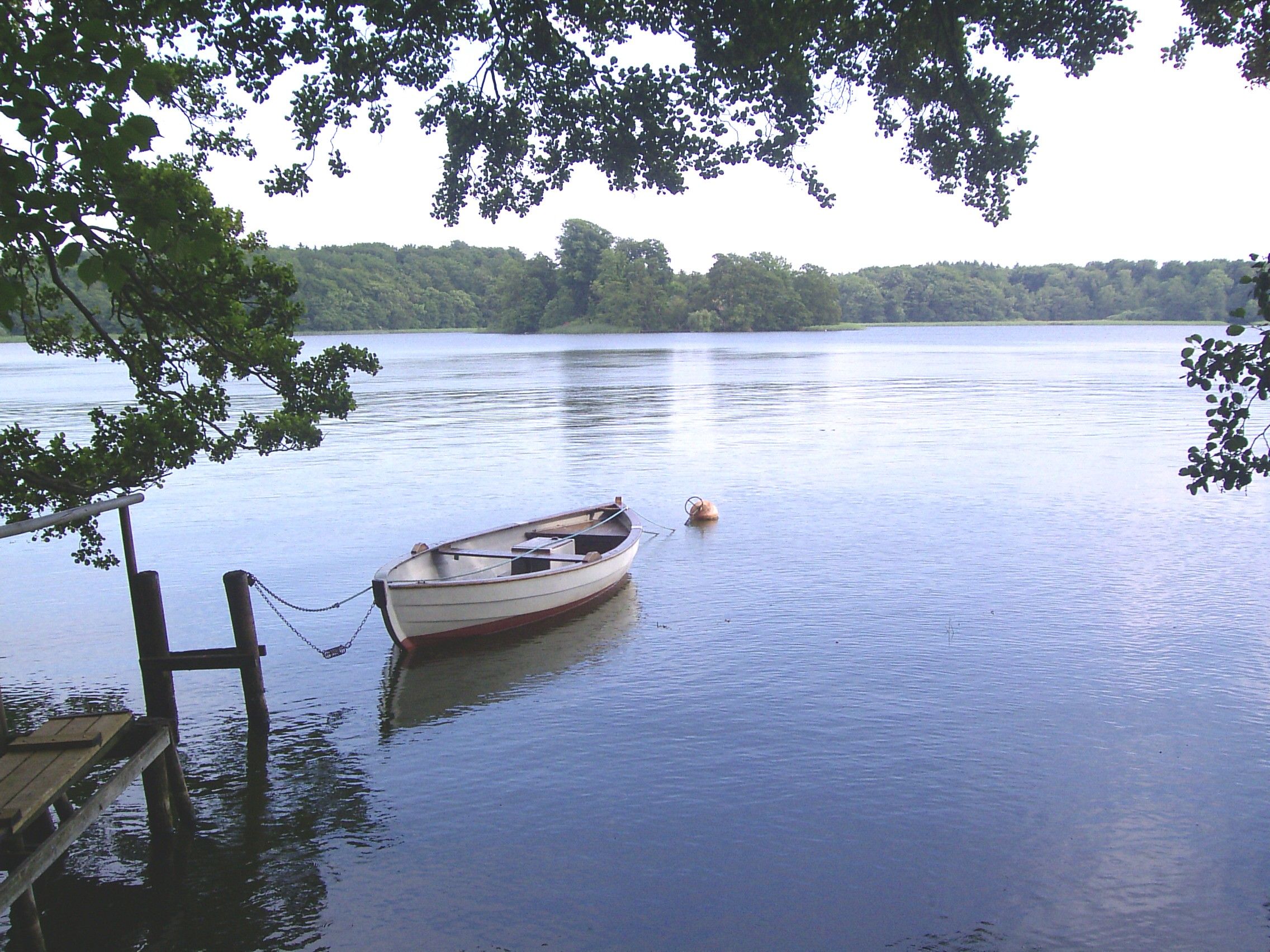

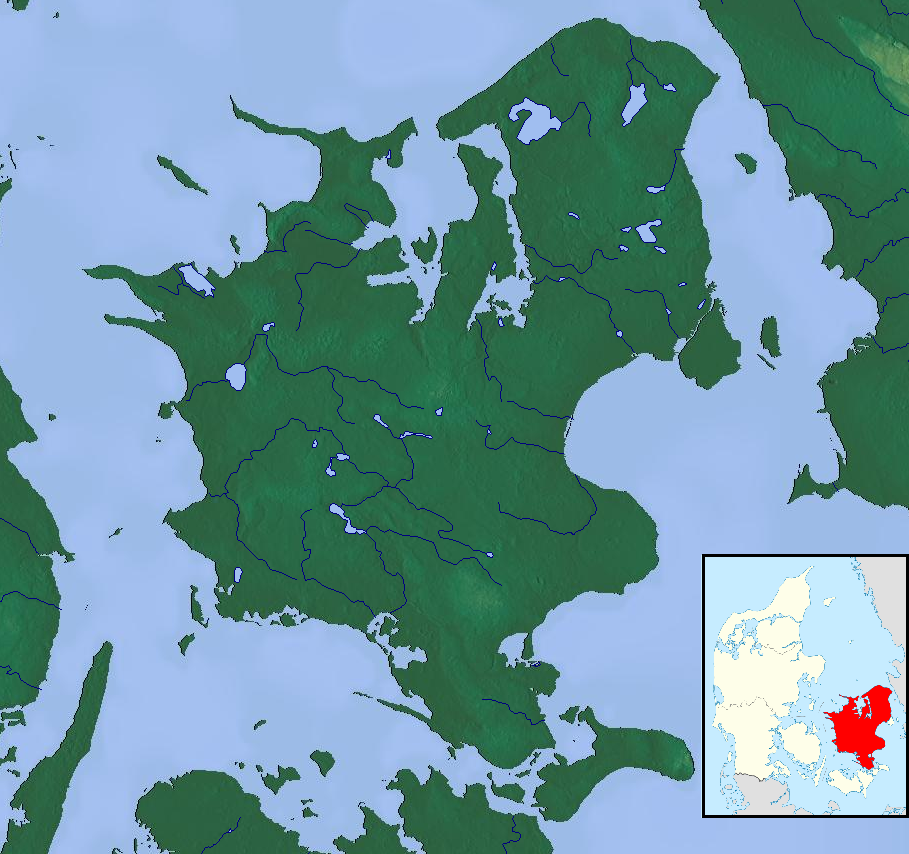
- Location within Zealand Location within Denmark
- Location: Northeastern Zealand
- Coordinates: 55°48′11″N 12°21′54″E
- Primary inflows: Mølleåen, Dumpedalsrenden, Vejlesø Kanal
- Primary outflows: Fiskebæk
- Basin countries: Denmark

Farum Lake (Danish: Farum Sø) is a lake in Northeastern Zealand, Denmark.

The lake lies to the northwest of Copenhagen in the Mølleå valley. It is located in Furesø municipality, which was formed January 1, 2007 as a merger of the two former municipalities Farum and Værløse. The town of Farum adjoins the northern edge of the lake, while the southern and western sides consist of unpopulated woodland with several camping places.

The lake is the 3rd largest in the Mølleå river course, after the adjacent larger Furesø and Bagsværd Sø. The lake has 2 small islands: Svaneholm and Klaus Nars Holm, on the latter of which is a privately owned home.

The lake is owned by the Danish environment ministry and Danish Nature Agency and is administered as part of Københavns Statsskovdistrikt.

The main inflow to the lake is Hestetangså at the western end of the lake. Outflow happens through the Fiskebæk, a short stream connecting to the neighbouring Furesø. During periods of strong easterly winds on Furesø, this flow can be reversed, raising the level of Farum Lake. Water quality in the lake is generally good and has been improving in recent years, but is not yet up to standards set by the authorities. The lake is regularly used for bathing in the summer months, particularly from the Farum side.

The lake is defined as both an EU bird protection and habitat area, and as such motor vessels are forbidden on the lake. The lake has a variety of bird life, including Common goldeneye duck, Tufted duck and Common merganser. In the summer marsh harriers can be sometimes seen. In the spring and autumn, Osprey also visit the lake. Common with many areas of Denmark, the bird population is threatened by escaped farmed mink, with trapping undertaken in the area to reduce their numbers.
