= Urban area of Copenhagen =

Urban area of Copenhagen, Denmark

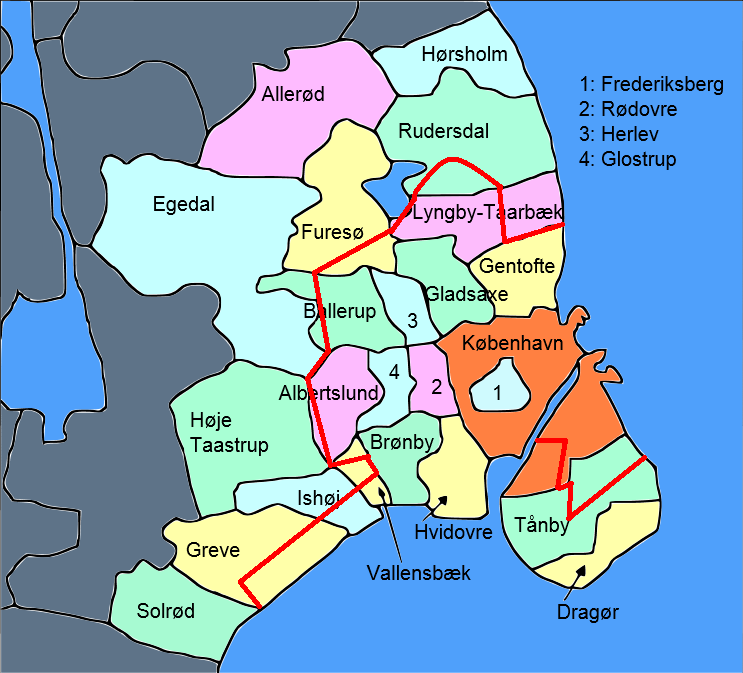
Urban area of Copenhagen outlined with red line

The urban area of Copenhagen (also known as Greater Copenhagen) (Danish: Storkøbenhavn or Hovedstadsområdet), lying mostly in the Capital Region of Denmark but also in Region Zealand, consist of Copenhagen and Frederiksberg municipalities and the former Copenhagen County. In all, it consists of 18 municipalities, and except parts of Ballerup, Greve (of former Roskilde County), Ishøj, former Søllerød and former Værløse, mentioned with (the part of) their population included from 2007. Ishøj and Greve Strand are included for the first time since 1999. As of 1 January 2026, this area had a population of 1,408,575. Statistics Denmark states that the definition of the urban area is based on UN's 200m definition.

== List of municipalities ==
According to Danmarks Statistik, since January 1, 2007 Hovedstadsområdet (English: the Capital area) comprises the following municipalities (Danish: kommune) (population, as of 1 January 2018, mentioned if only part of the municipality belongs to the urban area) :

- Copenhagen (a large area of western Amager is unpopulated) - 644,431
- Frederiksberg - 104,410
- Albertslund - 27,743
- Ballerup - 48,295
- Brøndby - 35,538
- Furesø (former Farum and Værløse) - 40,911
- Gentofte - 75,803
- Gladsaxe - 69,484
- Glostrup - 22,663
- Greve Strand - 49,974
- Herlev - 28,572
- Hvidovre - 53,282
- Ishøj - 22,988
- Lyngby-Taarbæk - 55,472
- Rødovre - 39,343
- Rudersdal (former Birkerød and Søllerød) - 55,989
- Taastrup - 50.686
- Tårnby (a very large area of western Amager and the Saltholm (2 inhabitants (2020)) and Peberholm (nature habitat) islands are unpopulated) - 43,063
- Vallensbæk - 16,280

== Hovedstadsområdet vs. urban area of Copenhagen ==
However Hovedstadsområdet (English: "The Capital Area") is not a definition for the urban area of Copenhagen. The area does not follow the recommendations of the United Nations regarding urban definitions (i.e. 200 meters between buildings as the required minimum) and is used for statistic issues only. The main difference between "Hovedstadsområdet" and common urban area definition (or city limits) involves the islands of Amager, Saltholm and Peberholm, and primarily the municipality of Tårnby. Copenhagen Municipality, Tårnby Municipality and Dragør Municipality is the three Municipalities on The Island of Amager.

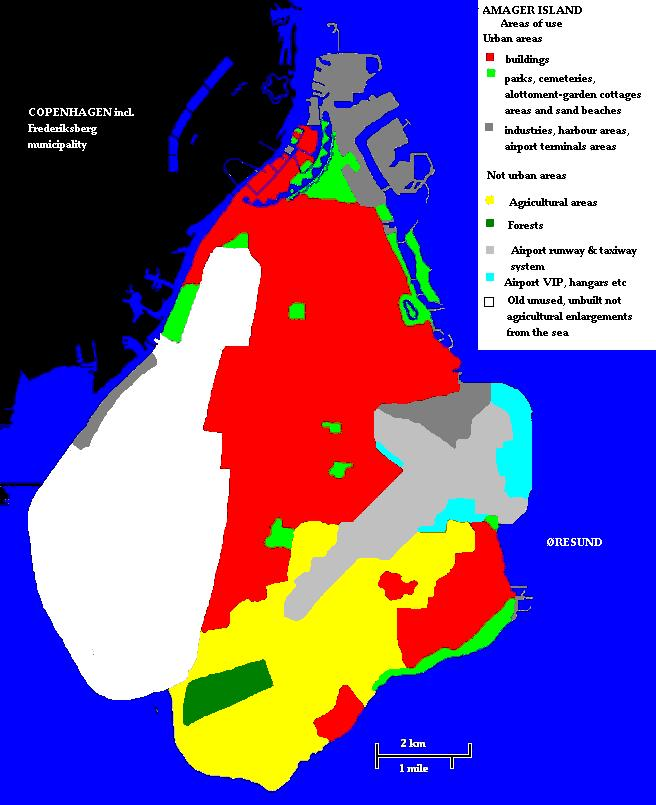
Amager island land use

"Hovedstadsområdet" contains the entire Copenhagen and Tårnby municipalities, although the latter contains large areas without buildings and inhabitants. This also applies to a smaller part of Copenhagen on Amager island.

The western part of Amager is an enlargement from a shallow part of the Øresund sea, gained from the sea during the 1930s to 1950s. This extended part of Amager is split between Copenhagen and Tårnby municipalities, and is only built-up on two minor areas. It also includes along the harbour and around Bella Center (which hosted the climate meeting COP 15 in December 2009). Apart from these smaller areas and an allotment-garden cottage area, the vast majority of western Amager is unplanned, with few buildings (like a shooting range). The cause for this creation was mainly to give shelter to the southern part of Copenhagen harbour. Since the area is now filled out with big stones, sand from the sea, plaster, wastes and unknown items, building in the area is expensive. Not even agriculture is possible due to bad soil. (However the southern part of Amager has agricultural areas and even a small forest, "Kongelunden" ("King's Grove"). These areas belong to a third municipality of Amager island, Dragør.)

Some of the unused area belongs to Copenhagen Municipality, but the Dragør Municipality and Tårnby Municipality part is far larger. Also the almost unpopulated islands of "Saltholm" (3 inhabitants in 2010) and "Peberholm" (unpopulated) belongs to Tårnby, and so does the taxi and runway system of Copenhagen Airport (with three long runways). In all, most of Tårnby and a minor part of Copenhagen municipalities on Amager island cannot be regarded as an urban area. Consequently, "Hovedstadsområdet" does not equal an urban area of Copenhagen.

Neither the Danish statistic authority "Danmarks Statistik" (which presents information regarding "Hovedstadsområdet") or the Danish geographical institute "Kort og Matrikelstyrelsen" (which determines the borders of "Hovedstadsområdet") states that "Hovedstadsområdet" is an urban area of Copenhagen. For internal Danish matters this is of no importance. But when comparing Copenhagen with other cities, the unpopulated non-urban areas of Amager, Saltholm and Peberholm do make a difference in f.i. terms of population density.

As of February 2012, Copenhagen lacks official urban borders for comparison with other cities. "Hovedstadsområdet" is an area invented primarily for statistical matters. It is rarely used in conversation (as a defined area). Sometimes in media the word "Hovedstadsområdet" represents a metropolitan area from Køge in the south to Elsinore in the north and Roskilde in the west. For instance, a regional television channel called "Hovedstads-TV", "Kanal Hovedstaden", "Kanal København" and "TV2 Lorry" and other "Local-TV Channels" covers this larger area and so on. But even in nationwide public service television news, the word "Hovedstadsområdet" may refer to either what the Danish statistic institute defines as "Hovedstadsområdet" or the metropolitan area.

Another similar area is "Storkøbenhavn" (eng. "Greater Copenhagen"). This is used by "Vejdirektoratet" ("the road authority") only. Just "Copenhagen" may refer either to the municipality, which has quite stingy borders (and totally surrounds Frederiksberg municipality), or the entire city, which does not have defined borders.

Until the 1970s, the city region of Copenhagen (Danish: København) was stated as the three municipalities Copenhagen, Frederiksberg and Gentofte. A better description of the city core (excluding all suburbs) would be south of the Dyrehaven forest in the north, the area east of the motorway called "motorring 3" and north of the motorway across Amager island which continues towards Sweden. This area includes Copenhagen (with Frederiksberg), Gentofte, most of Gladsaxe, Rødovre, Hvidovre and a part of Tårnby municipalities This area has around 900.000 to 950.000 inhabitants.

Urban Copenhagen and this city region are statistical abstracts only and have no political and/or administrative implications.

== See also ==
- List of urban areas in Denmark by population
- Copenhagen metropolitan area
- Danish Capital Region
- Øresund Region
