= 2021 Furesø municipal election =

- 16 November 2021

All 21 seats to the Furesø Municipal Council 11 seats needed for a majority
- Turnout: 23,143 (74.1%) ▼2.3pp
| | First party | Second party | Third party |
|---|---|---|---|
| | A | C | V |
| Party | Social Democrats | Conservatives | Venstre |
| Last election | 10 seats, 40.0% | 3 seats, 13.9% | 4 seats, 18.0% |
| Seats won | 8 | 5 | 3 |
| Seat change | ▼2 | ▲2 | ▼1 |
| Popular vote | 8,348 | 5,491 | 2,585 |
| Percentage | 36.4% | 24.0% | 11.3% |
| Swing | ▼3.6% | ▲10.1% | ▼6.7% |
| | Fourth party | Fifth party | Sixth party |
| | B | Ø | F |
| Party | Social Liberals | Red–Green Alliance | Green Left |
| Last election | 1 seat, 6.7% | 1 seat, 5.9% | 0 seats, 2.5% |
| Seats won | 2 | 2 | 1 |
| Seat change | ▲1 | ▲1 | ▲1 |
| Popular vote | 2,130 | 1,506 | 1,086 |
| Percentage | 9.3% | 6.6% | 4.7% |
| Swing | ▲2.6% | ▲0.7% | ▲2.2% |
| | Seventh party | Eighth party |
| | I | O |
| Party | Liberal Alliance | Danish People's Party |
| Last election | 1 seat, 4.7% | 1 seat, 4.0% |
| Seats won | 0 | 0 |
| Seat change | ▼1 | ▼1 |
| Popular vote | 499 | 280 |
| Percentage | 2.2% | 1.2% |
| Swing | ▼2.5% | ▼2.8% |
Mayor before election
Ole Bondo Christensen
Social Democrats
Mayor after election
Ole Bondo Christensen
Social Democrats

Following the 2009 election, only Ole Bondo Christensen had been mayor of Furesø Municipality. In the 2017 election, they had won 10 seats, one short on an absolute majority, but he still managed to get a majority to support him.

In this election, the Social Democrats would lose 2 seats. On the other end, the Conservatives managed to become the largest party of the traditional blue bloc for the first time in the municipality's history. (Note: counting since 2007 where the municipality was altered) However Ole Bondo Christensen would find a majority supporting him being mayor for a fourth term.

== Electoral system ==
For elections to Danish municipalities, a number varying from 9 to 31 are chosen to be elected to the municipal council. The seats are then allocated using the D'Hondt method and a closed list proportional representation. Furesø Municipality had 21 seats in 2021

Unlike in Danish General Elections, in elections to municipal councils, electoral alliances are allowed.

== Electoral alliances ==
=== Electoral Alliance 1 ===
| Party | | Political alignment |
|---|---|---|
| B | Social Liberals | Centre to Centre-left |
| C | Conservatives | Centre-right |

=== Electoral Alliance 2 ===
| Party | | Political alignment |
|---|---|---|
| D | New Right | Right-wing to Far-right |
| I | Liberal Alliance | Centre-right to Right-wing |
| O | Danish People's Party | Right-wing to Far-right |
| V | Venstre | Centre-right |

=== Electoral Alliance 3 ===
| Party | | Political alignment |
|---|---|---|
| F | Green Left | Centre-left to Left-wing |
| Ø | Red–Green Alliance | Left-wing to Far-Left |
| Å | The Alternative | Centre-left to Left-wing |

== Results by polling station ==
| Division | A | B | C | D | F | I | O | V | Æ | Ø | Å |
| Division | % | % | % | % | % | % | % | % | % | % | % |
|---|---|---|---|---|---|---|---|---|---|---|---|
| Værløse | 38.8 | 10.1 | 26.1 | 2.6 | 4.1 | 2.0 | 1.4 | 8.6 | 0.4 | 4.9 | 1.0 |
| Hareskov | 34.8 | 8.2 | 27.8 | 1.7 | 4.3 | 1.3 | 0.4 | 14.4 | 0.0 | 5.9 | 1.2 |
| Søndersø | 32.4 | 11.3 | 28.4 | 2.3 | 4.2 | 2.4 | 1.0 | 10.4 | 0.7 | 5.5 | 1.5 |
| Jonstrup | 36.5 | 10.7 | 15.4 | 1.9 | 15.8 | 1.9 | 1.0 | 7.3 | 0.1 | 8.0 | 1.5 |
| Stavnsholt | 36.4 | 8.7 | 27.1 | 1.9 | 3.4 | 2.6 | 1.0 | 11.7 | 0.2 | 6.1 | 1.1 |
| Solvang | 34.1 | 9.2 | 22.7 | 2.2 | 5.0 | 2.8 | 1.3 | 12.4 | 0.3 | 8.1 | 1.8 |
| Paltholm | 42.3 | 6.5 | 12.4 | 3.2 | 4.2 | 1.4 | 2.1 | 14.4 | 0.9 | 9.5 | 3.1 |

== Results ==
| Party | | Votes | % | +/- | Seats | +/- |
Furesø Municipality
| A | Social Democrats | 8,348 | 36.45 | -3.60 | 8 | -2 |
| C | Conservatives | 5,491 | 23.98 | +10.11 | 5 | +2 |
| V | Venstre | 2,585 | 11.29 | -6.72 | 3 | -1 |
| B | Social Liberals | 2,130 | 9.30 | +2.59 | 2 | +1 |
| Ø | Red-Green Alliance | 1,506 | 6.58 | +0.66 | 2 | +1 |
| F | Green Left | 1,086 | 4.74 | +2.26 | 1 | +1 |
| D | New Right | 535 | 2.34 | New | 0 | New |
| I | Liberal Alliance | 499 | 2.18 | -2.53 | 0 | -1 |
| Å | The Alternative | 354 | 1.55 | -1.29 | 0 | 0 |
| O | Danish People's Party | 280 | 1.22 | -2.76 | 0 | -1 |
| Æ | Freedom List | 89 | 0.39 | New | 0 | New |
| Total | | 22,903 | 100 | N/A | 21 | N/A |
| Invalid votes | | 60 | 0.19 | -0.06 | | |
| Blank votes | | 180 | 0.58 | -0.15 | | |
| Turnout | | 23,143 | 74.11 | -2.26 | | |
Source: valg.dk
