= Lake Bagsværd =

Lake in northeastern Zealand, Denmark

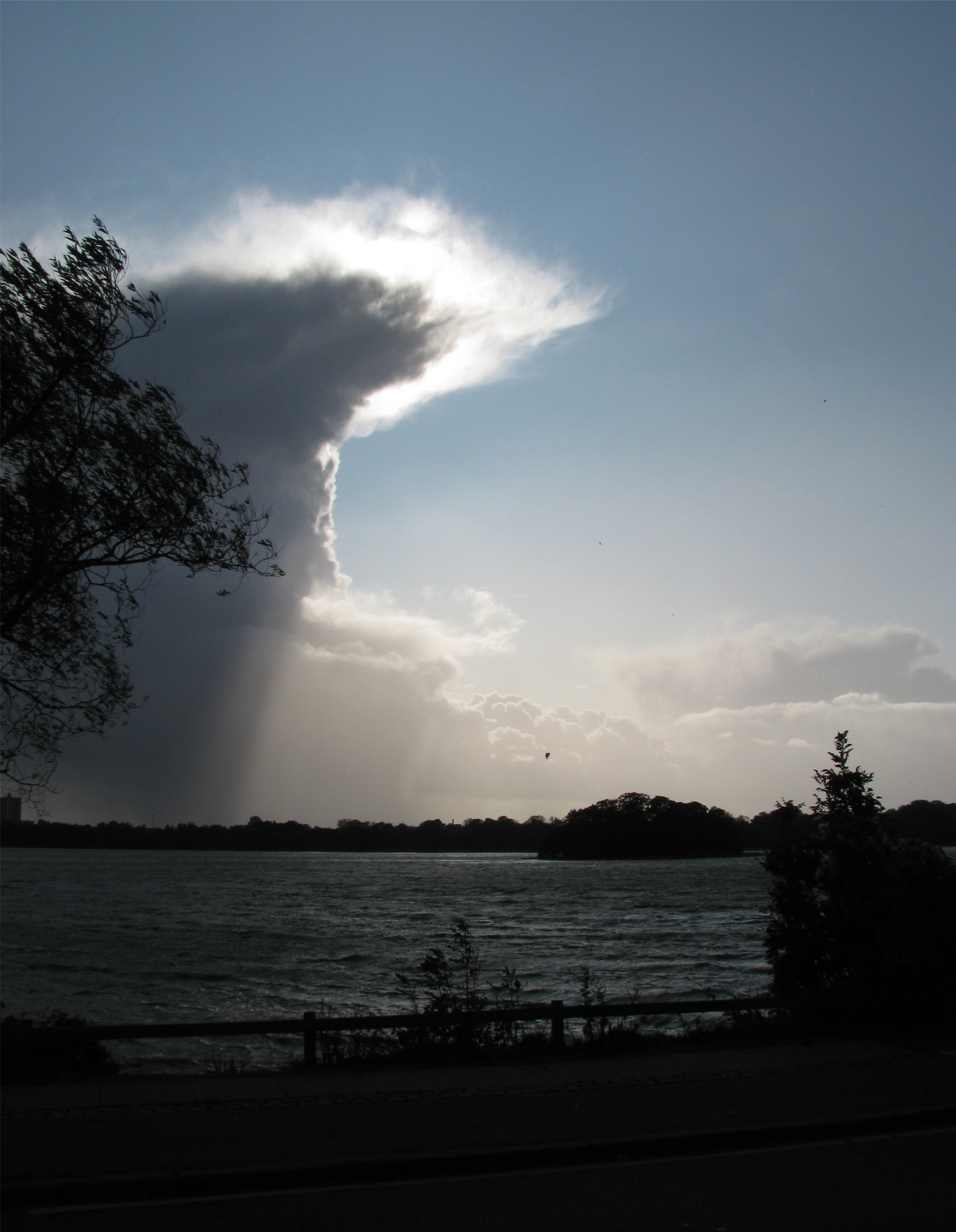

- Location within Denmark
- Location: Northeastern Zealand
- Coordinates: 55°46′20″N 12°27′30″E
- Primary inflows: Fiskebæk (Mølleåen), Dumpedalsrenden, Vejlesø Kanal
- Primary outflows: Mølleåen
- Basin countries: Denmark
- Surface area: 121 ha (300 acres)
- Max. depth: 3.5 m (11 ft)
- Water volume: 2.4 million cubic metres (1,900 acre⋅ft)
- Surface elevation: 18.5 m (61 ft)

Lake Bagsværd is a lake in northeastern Zealand, Denmark. After Furesø, it is the second largest lake in the Mølleå system. The lake is an appendix to the Mølleåen via Furå further on to Lyngby Lake.

The water quality in the lake is not suited for swimming as the lake still receives spillover from three outlets from the public sewer system. The sewer pollution is worsened by the fact that the water in the lake stays in the lake for several years. The lake receives very small amounts of clean water from the surrounding areas. Mostly because of very intensive fresh water pumping from nearby wells.

Bagsværd is the site of various international rowing, sailing, kayaking and windsurfing competitions. In the summer with its numerous beaches and only 15 kilometres (9.3 mi) north of Copenhagen, it is a site of relaxation for the Danish people.

A small part of the westernmost area of the lake has always been a part of Værløse Municipality and after its merger with Farum Municipality on 1 January 2007 is now a part of Furesø Municipality. Bagsværd is the adjacent suburb.

== Rowing competitions ==
Several international rowing competitions have been held at Lake Bagsværd. The 1963 European Rowing Championships for men were held on the lake (women competed in Moscow that year) as well as the 1971 European Rowing Championships (men and women). In 1978, the FISA Lightweight Championships were held at the venue, the only year in the history of World Rowing Championships when the lightweight competition was not held together with the open class. In September 2016, the World Rowing Masters Regatta was held on the lake.
