= Furesø =

Furesø may refer to:

- Furesø municipality, Denmark
- Furesø (lake), Denmark
