= Royal Danish Air Force Academy =

- Flyvevåbnets Officersskole
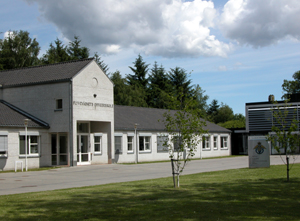
- Main entrance
- Motto: Per Doctrinam Vis
- Motto in English: Strength through knowledge
- Type: Air Force Academy
- Established: 1951; 75 years ago
- Affiliations: Forsvarsakademiet
- Officer in charge: H.C. Enevold
- Location: Værløse, Denmark; 55.753375°N 12.346070°E
- Campus: Jonstruplejren
- Website: http://forsvaret.dk/FLOS/

The Royal Danish Air Force Academy (Danish: Flyvevåbnets Officersskole) educates and commissions all officers for the Royal Danish Air Force. The Air Force Officer Academy function was initiated in 1951 by the creation of the Royal Danish Air Force.

== Location ==
The Air Force officers school is part of the Jonstrup Camp, in Jonstrup, near Værløse.

== Other Danish Academies ==
- Army: The Royal Danish Military Academy (Hærens Officersskole) located at Frederiksberg Palace in Copenhagen.
- Navy: The Royal Danish Naval Academy (Søværnets Officersskole) located at Holmen Naval Base in Copenhagen.
- Emergency Management Agency: The Emergency Management Officers School (Beredskabsstyrelsens Center for Lederuddannelse) located at Bernstorff Palace in Gentofte
