= Frederiksdal House =

Frederiksdal
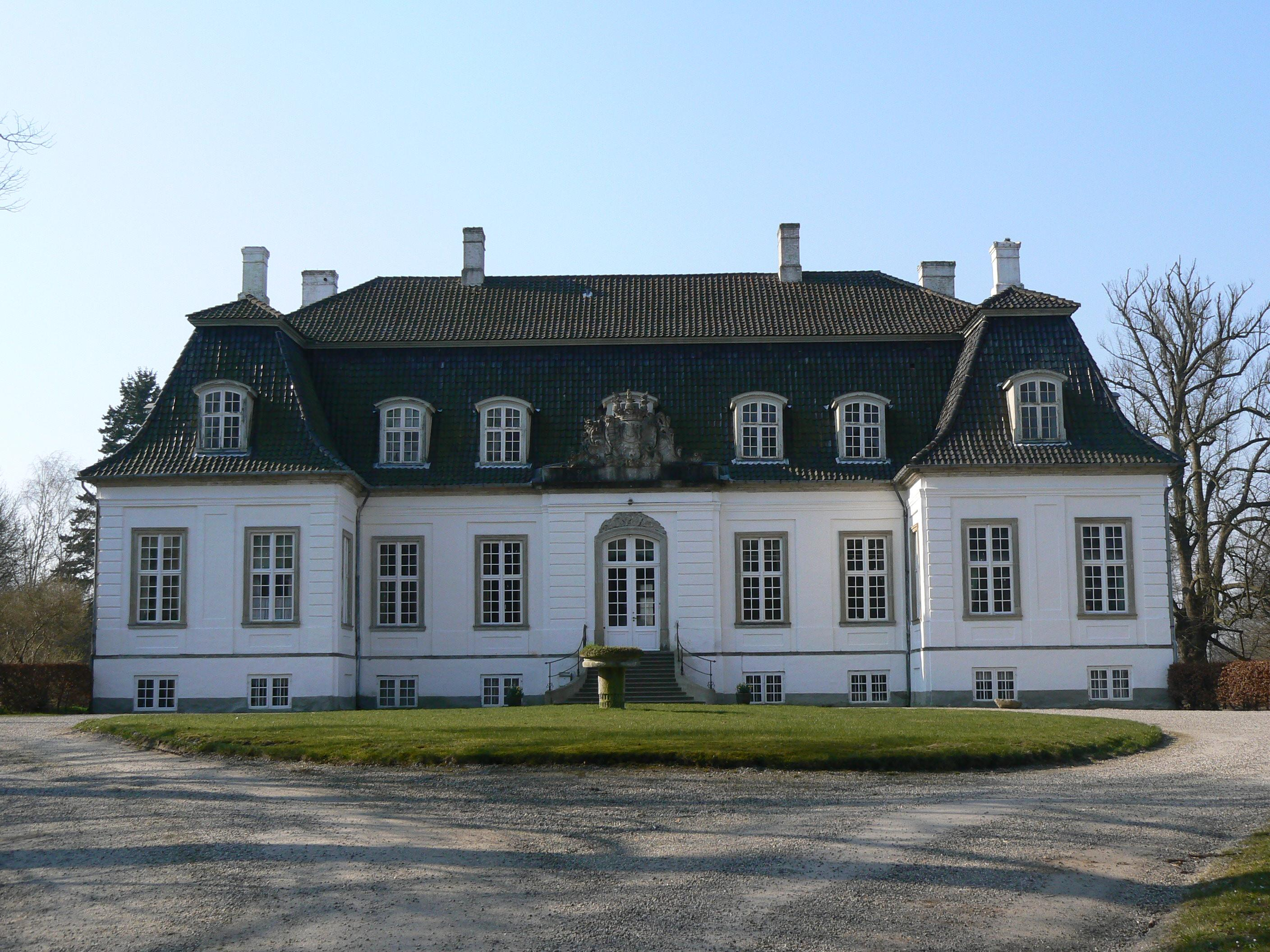
- Frederiksdal
- Interactive map of the Frederiksdal area

General information
- Architectural style: Rococo
- Location: Lyngby-Taarbæk, Copenhagen, Denmark, Denmark
- Coordinates: 55°46′57″N 12°27′3″E
- Construction started: 1744
- Completed: 1747
- Client: Johan Sigismund Schulin
- Owner: Sigismund Ahlefeldt-Laurvig

Design and construction
- Architect: Niels Eigtved

Website
- https://www.frederiksdalslot.dk/

Frederiksdal is a country house on the Furesø Lake north of Copenhagen, Denmark. The estate includes the earliest example of a maison de plaisance in Denmark, and covers 328 hectares of land of which circa 200 hectares are forest.

The estate dates back to the Middle Ages, when it was an ecclesiastical property known as Hjortholm within the Ancient Diocese of Roskilde. After the reformation, it became a possession of the Danish crown and saw industrial use during the 17th century. Frederiksdal was acquired by the Schulin family in 1743 and has remained in the family since. It is currently owned by the eighth generation of the Schulin family.

== History ==
=== Hjortholm ===
In the Middle Ages, the Frederiksdal estate was known as Hjortholm. Hjortholm was first mentioned in records from 1178, when it was listed as one of the properties owned by Esrum Abbey. In 1201, the estate came under the ownership of Roskilde Cathedral. In approximately 1250, Hjorholm manor house was built on the property on the shore of the Furesø. The manor became a residence and episcopal office for the successive bishops of the Ancient Diocese of Roskilde.

During the Count's Feud in 1535, Hjortholm was attacked and sieged by Count Christopher of Oldenburg. The estate came under cannon fire and its walls were decimated. Hjortholm was forced to surrender and the manor house was subsequently never rebuilt. It is speculated that many of the stones from the original structures were salvaged by local farmers and can still be found in old buildings in Virum.

=== Possession of the Crown ===
Following the Protestant Reformation in 1536, the estate was seized by the crown along with other ecclesiastical properties. Hjortholm Mill, a copper mill, was built at the site in 1650. That same year, the properties were leased out to Henrik Müller for industrial use, and an industrial community quickly formed around its brass and copper factories. As a result, Müller became a wealthy an influential figure within the country and soon expanded his production by leasing Nymølle as well.

The site was acquired by Frederick III in 1668 who renamed the property Frederiksdal (English: Frederick's Valley). The king put an end to the industrial works on the property, as he had plans to build a large maison de plaisance on the grounds for use as a summer residence. He died in 1670 before the planned construction had begun and his son, Christian V, abandoned the project. Christian V's wife, Queen Charlotte Amalie, then took up residence on the estate. Charlotte Amalie reinitiated the industrial production of the estate and expanded its output with the construction of a paper mill. Frederick IV ceded the estate to his sister, Princess Sophia Hedwig, who began the construction of a house on the land which for unknown reasons bore a striking resemblance with Ørholm Manor on the island of Funen, but it was never completed.

=== The Schulin family ===
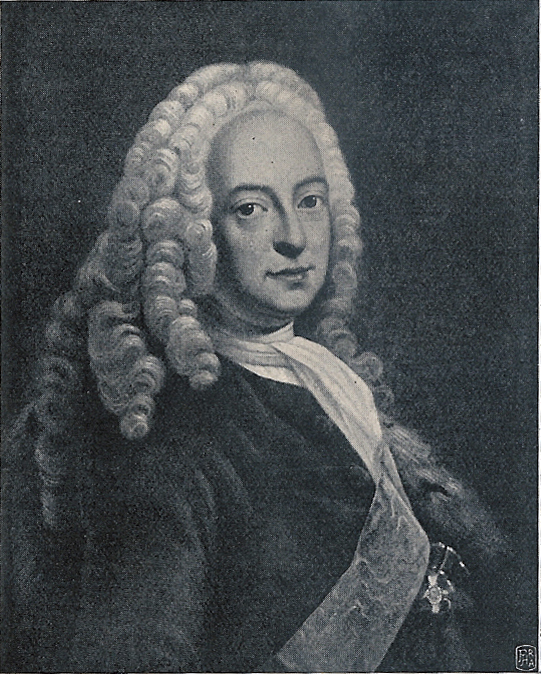
Johan Sigismund Schulin

The town of Bagsværd was separated from the Frederiksdal estate in 1735, and in 1739 Frederiksdal was put at the disposal of Johan Sigismund Schulin (1694–1750), a close friend of the royal family who had been ennobled by the crown in 1731 and received a number of prominent appointments since Christian VI's ascension to the throne in 1730. On 30 December 1743, Schulin was permanently granted ownership the property from the king. He charged royal architect Niels Eigtved with the design of a summer residence. Construction began in 1744 and was completed in 1747. Schulin was made a Count in 1750, but died later that same year.

Schulin's eldest son, Frederik Ludvig Schulin (1747–1781) was only two years old when his father died. The estate was therefore managed by his mother, Catarine Marie Schulin (née von Møsting), who carried out alterations on the building in 1752 and 1753 with the assistance of the architect Johann Gottfried Rosenberg. During her tenure the naturalist Otto Friedrich Müller made and published the observations of protists and flora found on the estate that made his reputation.

In 1771, Frederik married Sophie Hedevig von Warnstedt (1753–1807). The grown-up Frederik Ludvig Schulin has been described as incompetent and financially irresponsible. Within a few years of taking charge of the estate from his mother, he was on the verge of bankruptcy, and had been ordered by the supreme court to pay off his debts. It has therefore been speculated that Frederiksdal only remained in the hands of the Schulin family as a result of his early death in 1781. He had one son, Sigismund Ludvig who had been born in 1777. Like his father before him, he was only three years old when he unexpectedly inherited the estate, and so it was managed by his mother Sophie Hedevig until her death in 1807.

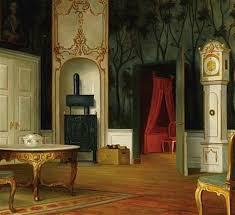
Christian Tilemann-Petersen: Guest room at Frederiksdal, 1925

Sigismund had been engaged to Louisa Brown since 1805, but the couple did not marry until 6 January 1808. The couple had eight children: Johan Sigismund (born 1808), Sophie Hedevig (born 1810), Alexander William (born 1811), Johanne Elisabeth (born 1813), Louise Christiane (born 1815), Marie Albertine Mathilde (born 1820), Christian Frederik (born 1822), and a stillborn son (1825). Sigismund died on New Year's Eve 1836, and the property was inherited by his eldest son, Johan Sigismund (1808–1880). He married Charlotte Zeuthen in 1839 and the couple had 7 children. He was succeeded by his son, Sigismund Ludvig, who died in 1929 without an heir, and so the property passed to his brother Vilhelm Peter's son, Sigismund Lensgreve (1892–1968). Sigismund Lensgreve had married Johanne Amalie Schou in 1920, and upon his death in 1968, their son Johan Sigismund (1921–1992) took over ownership of the estate. The property then passed to Johan Sigismund's wife, Karen Vibeke, after his death in 1992. She and her husband had no children, and she gave ownership over to their relative, Carl Christian Sigismund Ahlefeldt-Laurvig, in 2016.

== Architecture ==
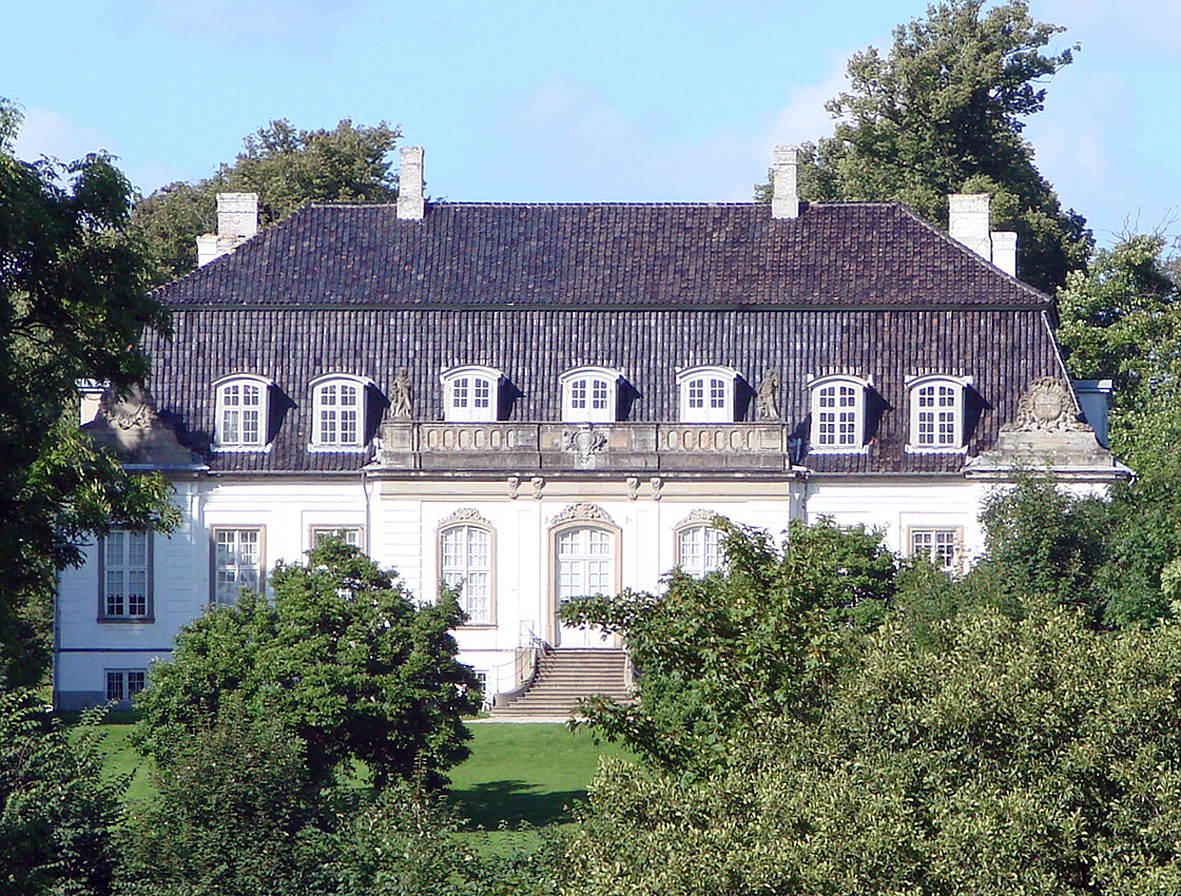
The house seen from the garden

The main building was designed by architect Nicolai Eigtved and erected between 1744 and 1747. Its floorplan consists of a single wing connected to two side wings on northern side. The house originally had a hipped roof above a high basement. The mansard roof is the result of alterations carried out by Johann Gottfried Rosenberg between 1752 and 1753. Frederiksdal is credited with being the earliest example of a maison de plaisance in Denmark and the building is today protected. It underwent restoration work in the 1970 under architect J. Raasschou-Nielsen.

The exterior facade stands in white-dressed masonry with sandstone decorations above the windows and two corner risalits on the main facade. The interior features a combination of large and small rooms symmetrically arranged around the main axis' vestibule and conservatory. There are rich Rococo stucco decorations, particularly in the Garden Hall, executed by Carlo Enrico Brenno and Giovanni-Battista Fossati.

== Geography and forests ==
The hilly landscape of Frederiksdal was created by meltwater erosion from the last ice age. This erosion also created the lakes which surround the estate: Furesø to the north and Bagsværd Sø to the south. Store Hulsø, a lake within the western part of the estate, was created by a glacial kettle which gave the lake steep banks with no inflow apart from direct rainwater. The flora of Store Hulsø includes Schoenoplectus lacustris, Potamogeton, and water lilies.

The area surrounding the Store Hulsø is populated by birch, baltic pine, and alder forests. Approximately 200 hectares of the estate are covered by three distinct forests: Frederiksdal Storskov, Nybro Forest and the Spurveskjul Forest. Much of Frederiksdal Storskov has been designated as a protected area within Natura 2000.

The estate is home to a significant population of foxes, badgers, and deer. More than 171 bird species have been recorded within the estate, including: great spotted woodpecker, little grebe, goldeneye, moorhen, northern lapwing, little ringed plover, european honey buzzard, rough-legged buzzard, osprey, wood sandpiper, green sandpiper, chaffinch, brambling, grey heron.

== List of owners ==
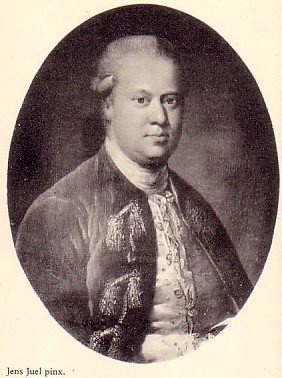
Frederik Ludvig Schulin

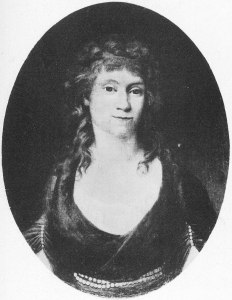
Sophie Hedevig Schulin

- The Crown, 1668–1670
- Queen Charlotte Amalie, 1670–1714
- The Crown, 1714–1716
- Princess Sophie Hedevig, 1716–1735
- The Crown, 1735–1739
- Johan Sigismund Schulin, 1747–1750
- Frederik Ludvig Schulin, 1750–1781
- Sophie Hedevig Schulin (née Warnstedt), 1781–1807
- Sigismund Schulin, 1807–1836
- Johan Sigismund Schulin, 1836–1880
- Sigismund Ludvig Schulin, 1880–1929
- Sigismund Lensgreve Schulin, 1929–1968
- Johanne Amalie Schulin (née Schou), 1968–1970
- Johan Sigismund Vilhelm Schulin, 1970–1992
- Karen Vibeke Schulin (née Østergaard), 1992–2016
- Carl Christian Sigismund Ahlefeldt Laurvig, 2016–present
