= Jonstrup =

Coordinates: 55.7572°N 12.3386°E

Jonstrup is a suburban neighbourhood situated in Furesø Municipality on the west side of Hareskoven forest in the northwestern outskirts of Copenhagen, Denmark. The original village has merged with the neighbouring villages of Måløv in Ballerup Municipality and Smørumnedre in Egedal Municipality to form an urban agglomeration with a population of 21,918 (2026). The neighbourhood is separated from Måløv by Mølledalen, Møllemosen, and Værebro Å.

== History ==
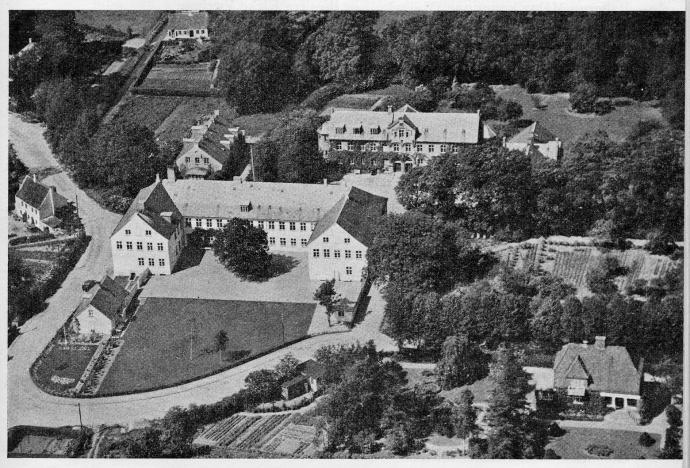
Jonstrup Seminarium

A textile mill was established on the site in the middle of the 1770s. In 1777, it was acquired by Abraham Schneider. In the follow year, it was destroyed by fire. A large new factory complex was inaugurated in 1781. In 1809, it was converted into a teachers' seminar, Jonstrup Seminarium, which moved to new premises in Kongens Lyngby in 1955. Conveniently located close to the Værløse Air Base, the buildings in Jonstrup were then acquired by the Danish military and converted into the new Royal Danish Air Force Officers School. It moved to the nearby Jonstrup Camp (Jonstruplejren) in 1995. In 1998, Værløse Municipality acquired the building and converted it into a primary school.

== Notable people ==
- Jens Ernst Wegener (1781-1846) an educator and pedagogical writer, principal of Jonstrup Seminarium, 1819 to 1838
- Hans Christian Cornelius Mortensen (1856 in Jonstrup – 1921) a Danish teacher and ornithologist, the first to employ bird ringing for scientific purposes
