= Listed buildings in Furesø Municipality =

This is a list of listed buildings in Furesø Municipality, Denmark.

== The list ==
Listing name	Image	Location	Coordinates	Description
Farum Rectory		Kålundsvej 33A, 3520 Farum	55°48′24.84″N 12°21′25.2″E	Half timbered rectory from 1724, located next to the graveyard Farum Church
Farumgård		Søvej 8, 3520 Farum	55°48′20.9″N 12°21′37.77″E	Manor house from 1705 designed by François Dieussart
Kulhus		Ved Kulhus 3, 3500 Værløse	55°46′33.22″N 12°24′44.83″E	A two-winged house from 1769, now serving as a local cultural centre. Located on the north side of Hareskov and close to Furesø
