= Mikkel Jensen (footballer, born 1977) =

Danish footballer (born 1977)

Personal information
- Date of birth: 6 January 1977 (age 49)
- Place of birth: Værløse, Denmark
- Position: Midfielder

Youth career
- Værløse BK

Senior career*
Years	Team	Apps	(Gls)
1997–2002	Brøndby IF	88	(2)
2002	→ FC Midtjylland (loan)	11	(0)
2003–2009	Hammarby IF	112	(2)
2009	→ IF Brommapojkarna (loan)	4	(0)
2010–2011	IF Brommapojkarna	10	(0)

International career
1997–1999	Denmark U-21	21	(0)

Managerial career
- 2011–2014: Karlbergs BK (assistant)
- * Club domestic league appearances and goals

Mikkel Jensen (born 6 January 1977) is a Danish retired football player in the central midfielder position. He has won three Danish Superliga championships with Brøndby IF. Jensen played 47 games and scored one goal for various Danish national youth selections, including 21 matches for the Danish under-21 national team. He was named 1998 Danish under-21 Talent of the Year.

== Playing career ==
Born in Værløse, Jensen started playing football with Værløse BK before moving to multiple Danish champions Brøndby IF. He made his Danish Superliga debut for Brøndby IF in April 1997 and played two games as Brøndby won the 1996-97 Superliga championship. He made his debut for the Denmark national under-21 football team in August 1997. Jensen went on to play 21 games for the under-21 team until December 1999, and was named 1998 Danish under-21 Talent of the Year.

Jensen won the 1997-98 and 2001-02 Danish Superliga championships with Brøndby, and played for Brøndby in the 1999 UEFA Champions League. He played a total 108 games in all competitions for Brøndby, including 88 games and two goals in the Superliga. When Brøndby hired new manager Michael Laudrup in the summer 2002, Jensen was deemed surplus to requirements. He had a short stop at league rivals FC Midtjylland, playing 11 games in the first half of the 2002-03 Superliga season before leaving Brøndby.

In early 2003 Jensen joined Swedish club Hammarby IF for their winter training camp, competing with Finnish midfielder Simo Valakari for a permanent contract. He scored a goal in a training game against the Malta national team and subsequently signed a three-year contract with Hammarby. He played six years at Hammarby and served as team captain. In the summer of 2006 he suffered a knee injury which eventually demanded a one-and-a-half-year recovery period. He returned in 2007, but suffered a relapse.

In July 2009 Jensen left the club and moved on loan to fellow Stockholm-based club IF Brommapojkarna for the remainder of the season. At Brommapojkarna he looked to establish himself as a central defender. After the loan period ended he got a permanent two-year contract with Brommapojkarna, signing on a free transfer. In 2011 Jensen decided to retire from football.

== Honours ==
- Danish Superliga: 1996-97, 1997-98, 2001-02
- 1998 Danish under-21 Talent of the Year
