= Kurt Stendal =

Danish footballer (1951–2019)

Personal information
- Full name: Kurt Stendal
- Date of birth: 19 February 1951
- Place of birth: Frederiksberg, Denmark
- Date of death: 21 August 2019 (aged 68)
- Place of death: Værløse, Denmark
- Position: Midfielder

Senior career*
| Years | Team | Apps | (Gls) |
| 1970–1971 | Hvidovre IF | 27 | (10) |
| 1972–1973 | Sturm Graz | 58 | (19) |
| 1973 | Hvidovre IF | 6 | (4) |
| 1973–1978 | Sturm Graz | 111 | (40) |
| 1978–1979 | Hvidovre IF | 57 | (17) |
| 1979–1982 | Sturm Graz | 62 | (9) |

International career
| 1973 | Denmark | 1 | (1) |

Managerial career
- 1984–1985: Hvidovre IF
- 1986: Landskrona BoIS
- 198?–198?: Hellerup IK
- * Club domestic league appearances and goals

Kurt Stendal (19 February 1951 – 21 August 2019) was a Danish footballer who played as a midfielder. He was born in Frederiksberg.
