= Mølleåen =

River in North Zealand, Denmark

Coordinates: 55°48′15″N 12°31′22″E

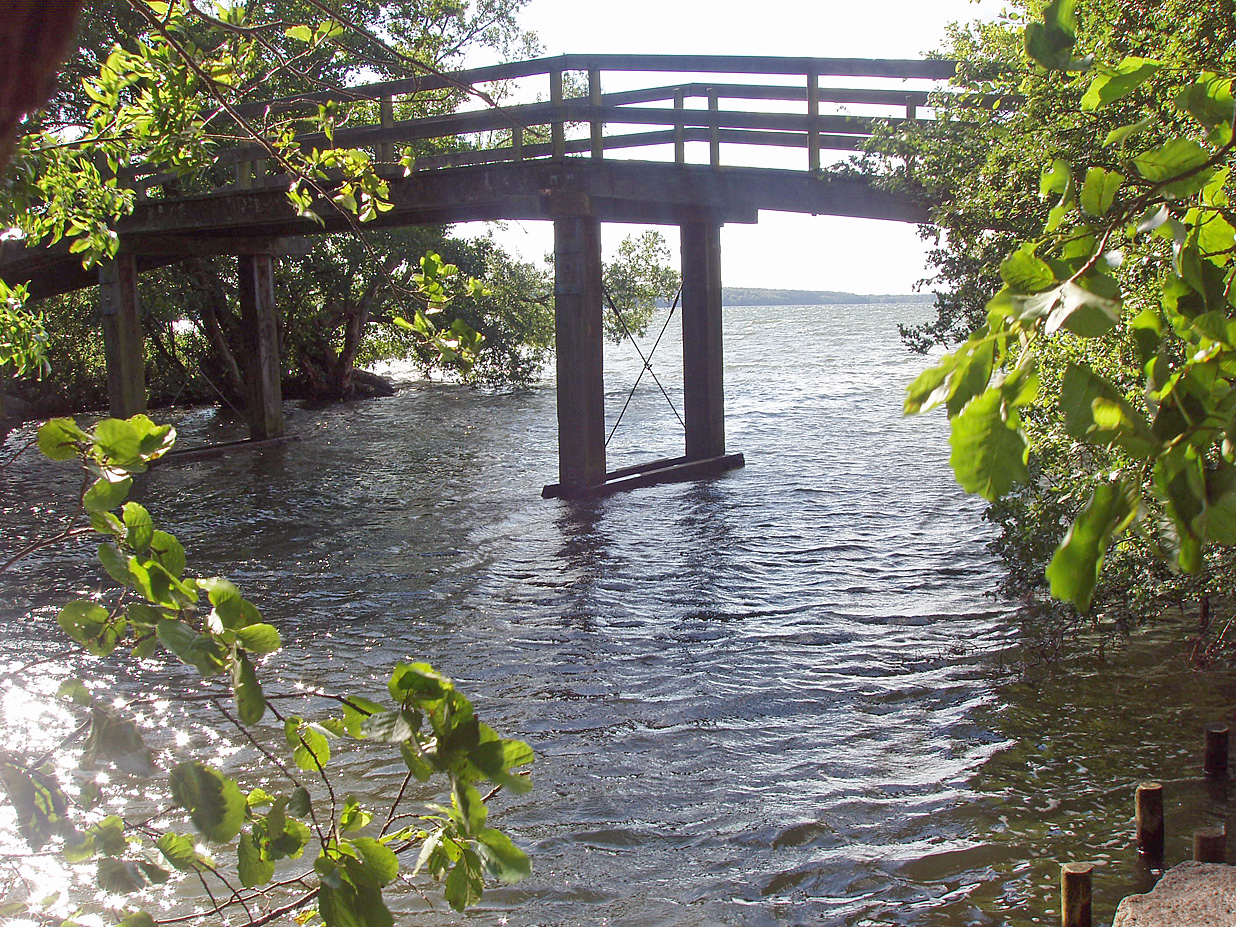
Mølleåen in Frederiksdal

Mølleåen (also Mølleå, the indefinitive form) sometimes translated as the Millstream, is a small, slow running river or stream in North Zealand, Denmark, which runs 36 kilometres (22 mi) from the west of Bastrup Sø near Lynge to the Øresund between Taarbæk and Skodsborg. The river bed contains several country houses and a series of mills which initiated Denmark's industrial development.

== Course ==
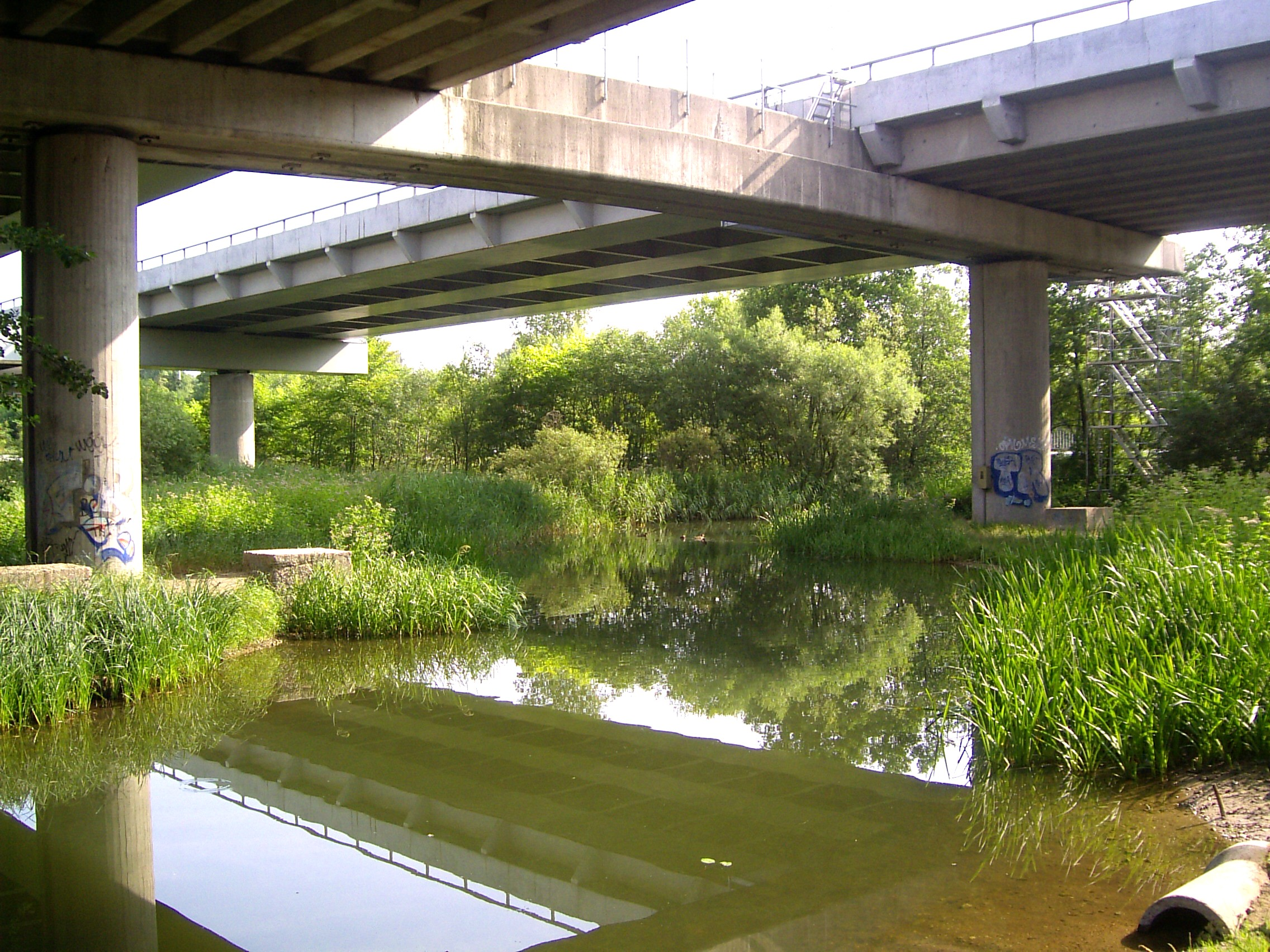
The river below the Fiskerbæk motorway bridge

The source of the river is Hettings Mose between the lakes of Buresø and Bastrup Sø. Over the next 30 kilometres (19 mi), the river drops 29 metres (95 ft) until it reaches the sea. After Bastrup Sø, the river runs through a swampy area to Farum Sø. The following section is called "Fiskebæk Å", passing under the Hillerød motorhighway (E16) and Frederiksborgsvej before reaching Denmark's deepest lake, Furesø, with a depth of 38 metres (125 ft).

The natural course of the stream between Furesøen and Nybro was changed as part of fortification works in the period 1885–1894 and is totally straight, the only remnant of these defenses.

After passing through Frederiksdal Storskov, the river runs under Nybrovej until it runs into the lake of Lyngby Sø. Between here and the sea, the river falls a further 20 m (66 ft), providing excellent opportunities for water mills. The river winds through the gardens of Sorgenfri Palace to Fuglevad water mill which later became part of the Brede Copper Works. The river then continues to the north past the Frilandsmuseum and on to Brede Museum. It then proceeds past Øhrholm and Ravneholm to Nymølle, used to hammer copper and brass from the mid-17th century. It then flows under the Helsingør Motorway to Stampen where previously a textile factory, a flour mill and a bakery used to exist. After passing through Raadvad, the Mølleåen finally arrives at Strandmøllen before reaching the Øresund.

== History ==
As early as the Viking Age, the river was used for milling. From the Middle Ages, the water power of the river was increased by means of dams between the lake of Furesø and the river mouth at the Øresund. In the 17th century, sizeable industrial enterprises were established along the river giving it the reputation of being the cradle of Danish industry. They included mills for the production of textiles, metals, paper and armaments. The factories operated until the 1950s after which they began to close, leaving buildings that were put to other uses. They included the Brede Works, now an industrial museum, and the Strandmøllen paper mill.

== Landmarks ==
The principal landmarks along the river valley consist of exclusive country houses and palaces and of water mills which developed into factories.

=== Mansions ===
The Farumgård manor house built in the Rococo style in 1705 overlooks Farum Lake (Farum Sø). The public footpath around the lake leads through the acclaimed Baroque gardens. Næsseslottet on Furesø is a country house from 1783 which was built by the Dutch shipping entrepreneur Frédéric de Coninck. The park, which includes several obelisks is open to the public. Frederiksdal House at the south end of Furesø is a white Rococo mansion designed by Nicolai Eigtved and Johann Gottfried Rosenberg in the mid-18th century. It is not open to the public.

The open-air museum Frilandsmuseet in Lyngby consists of a collection of old houses, farms and mills which have been moved to the site to show how people lived in former times. Sophienholm between the river to the north and Lake Bagsværd to the south dates from 1768 but was completely rebuilt by the affluent businessman Constantin Brun in 1805. It is now an exhibition centre.

Owned by the Danish royal family, Sorgenfri Palace was built by the French architect François Dieussart in 1706. The main building was redesigned in the Neoclassical style by Peter Meyn in 1790. Some parts of the gardens are open to the public.

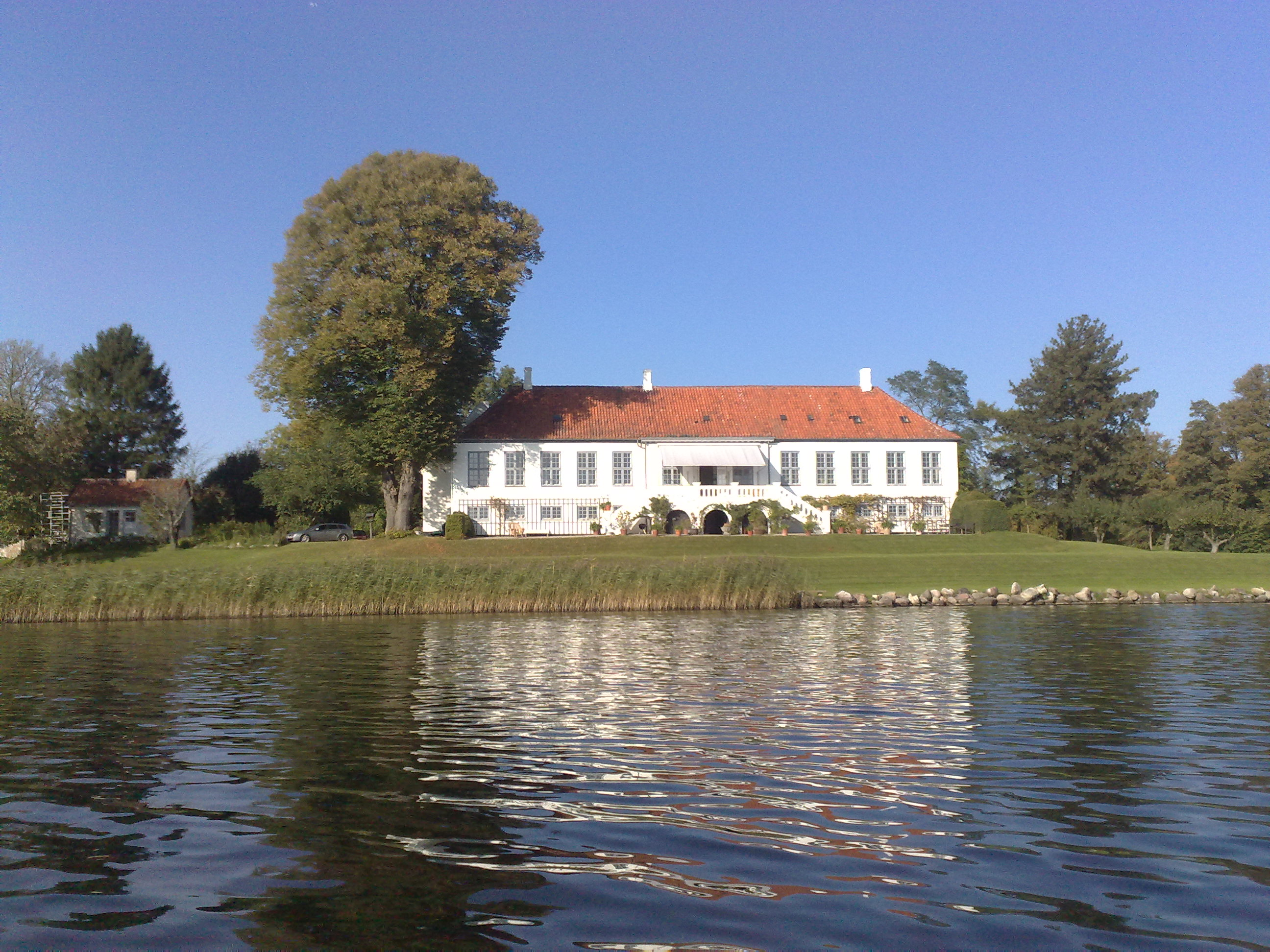
Farumgård

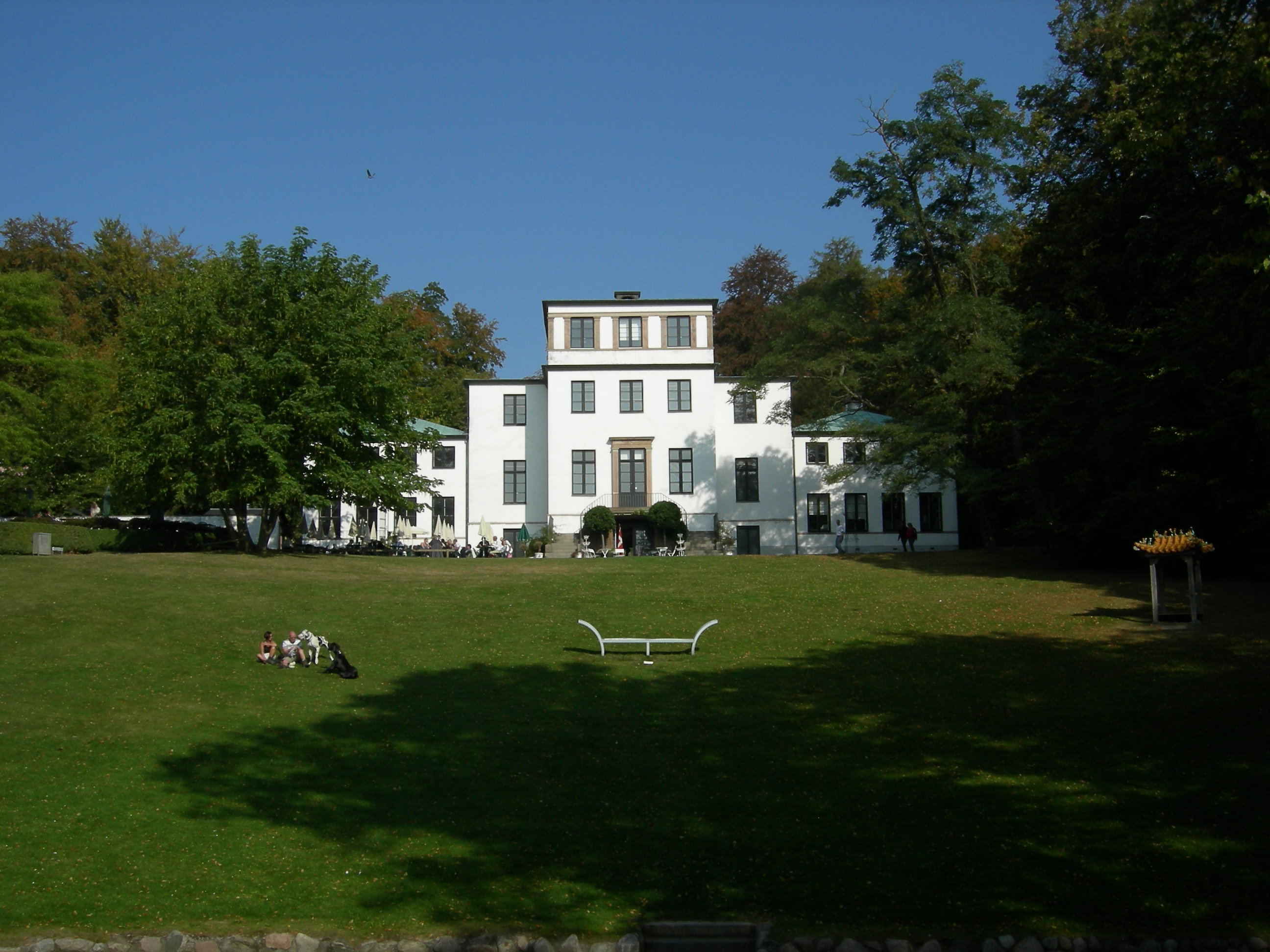
Sophienholm

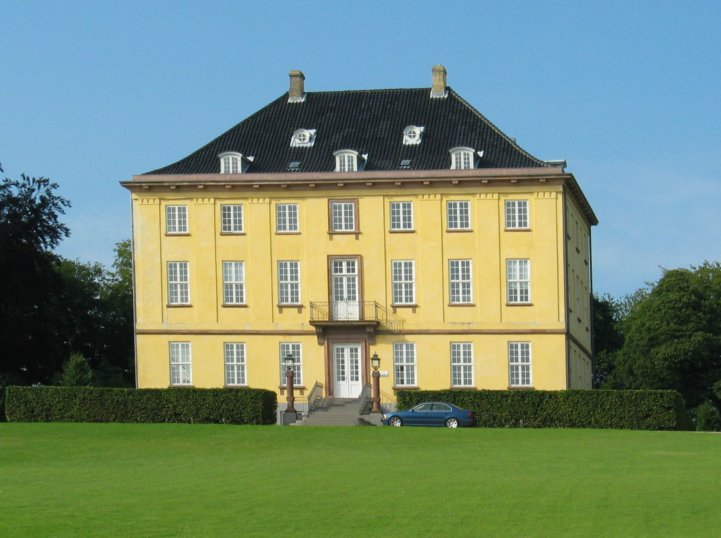
Næsseslottet

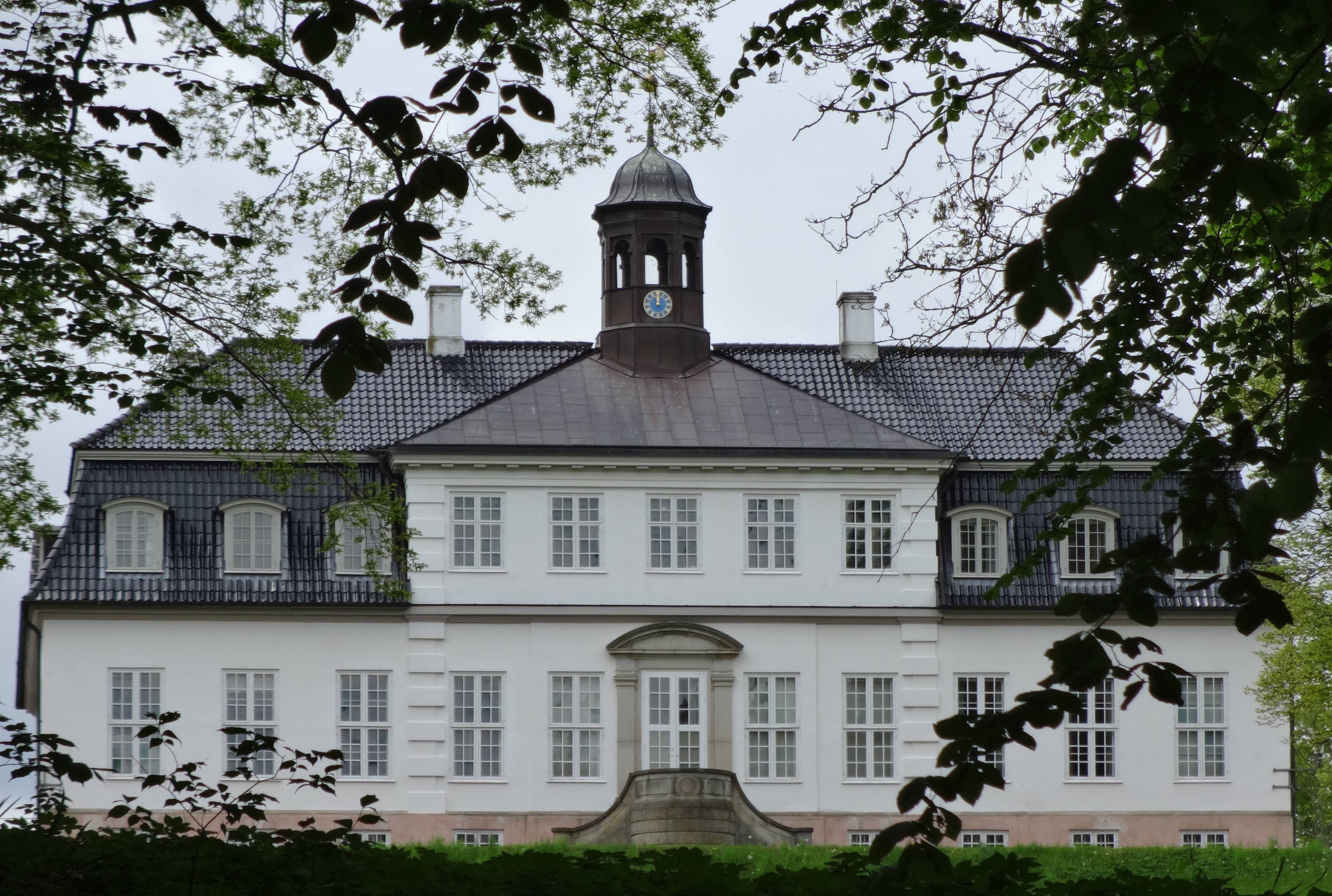
Sorgenfri Palace

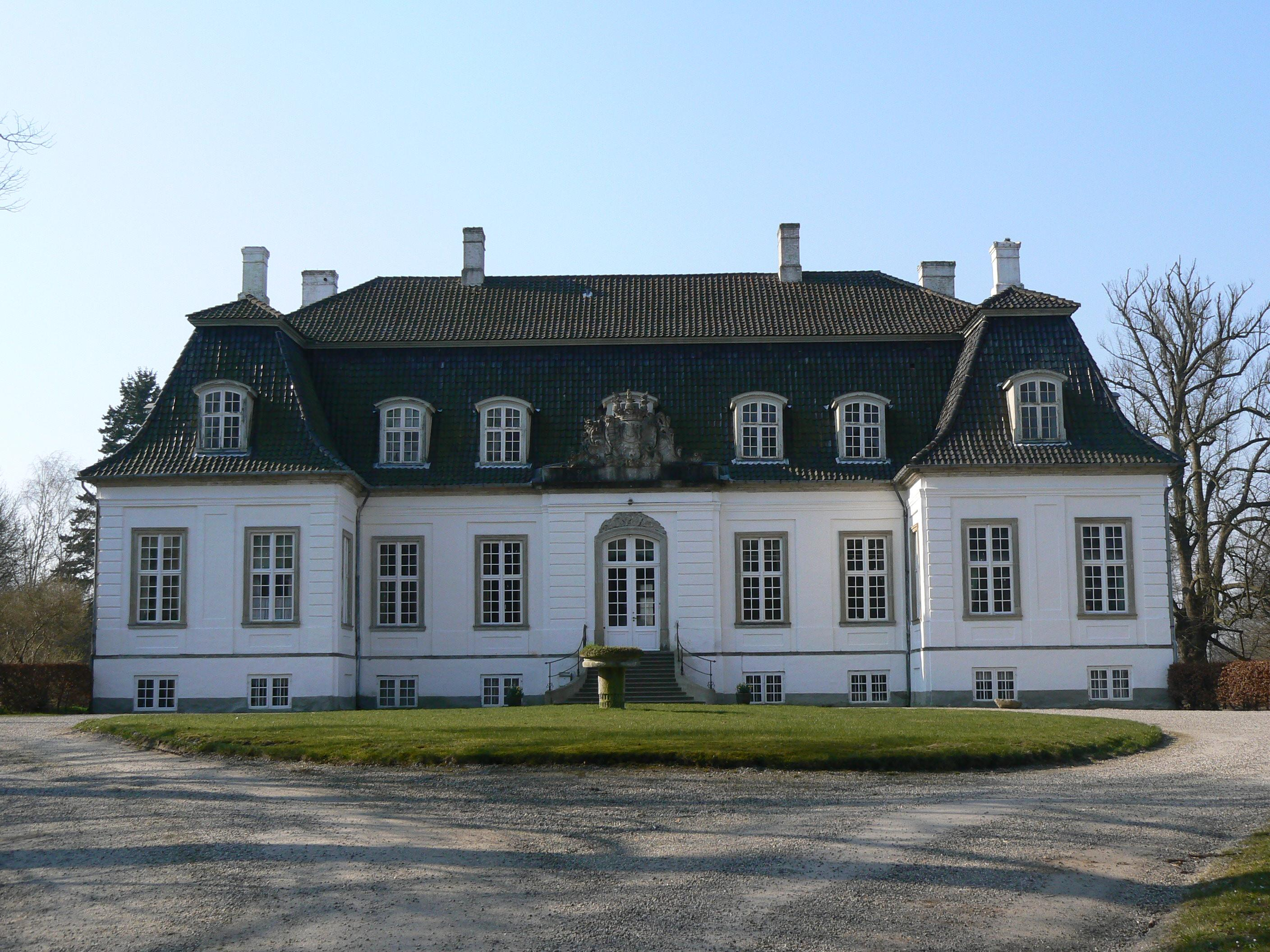
Frederiksdal

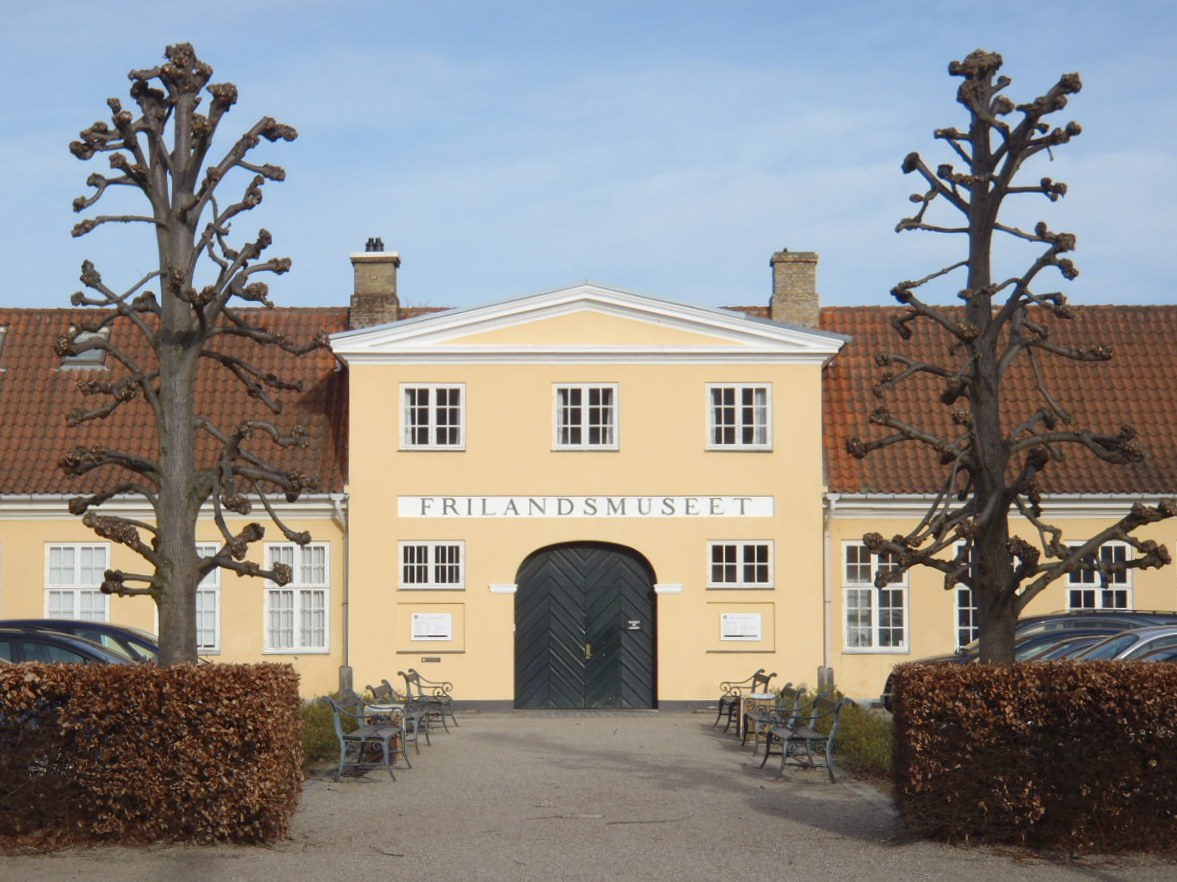
Frilandsmuseet

=== Mills and factories ===
The Brede Works originated with a mill in 1370 which was adapted to production gunpowder in 1628, copper from 1668 to 1855 and textile from 1831 until the factory closed in 1956. The museum documents the growth of industry along the river and has a large collection of historic clothing. Located at the mouth of the river, Strandmøllen (the Beach Mill) from 1599 is a historic paper mill. With a history dating back to at least the 15th century, Lyngby Mill with its large water wheel has been restored and is the only mill in the Mølleå Valley which is still fully operational. Other former mills between Sorgenfri and the Øresund include Fuglevad (1492), Ørholm (from 1370), Nymølle (mid-17th century), Stampen (13th century) and Raadvad (1643).

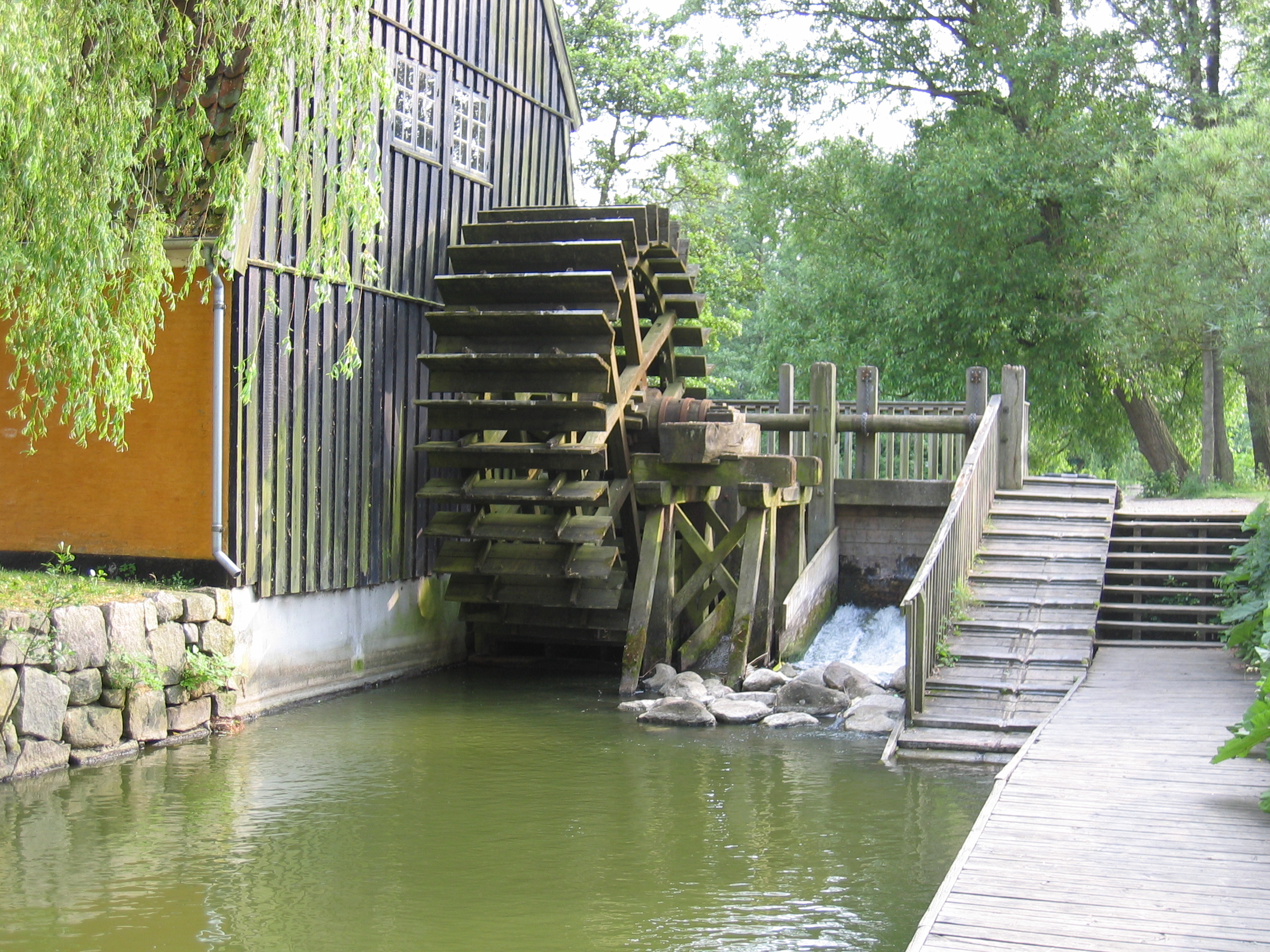
Lyngby Mill

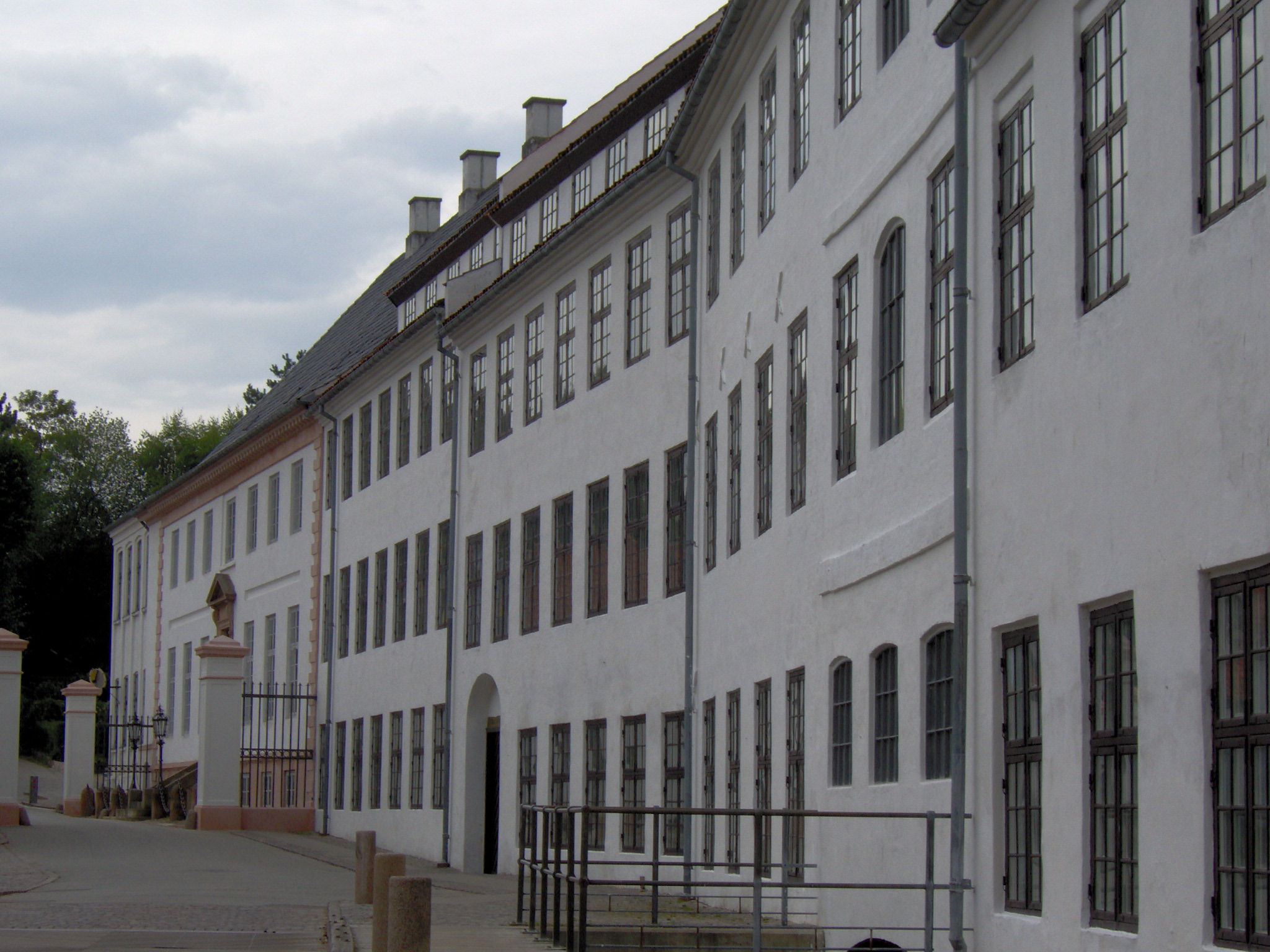
Brede Works

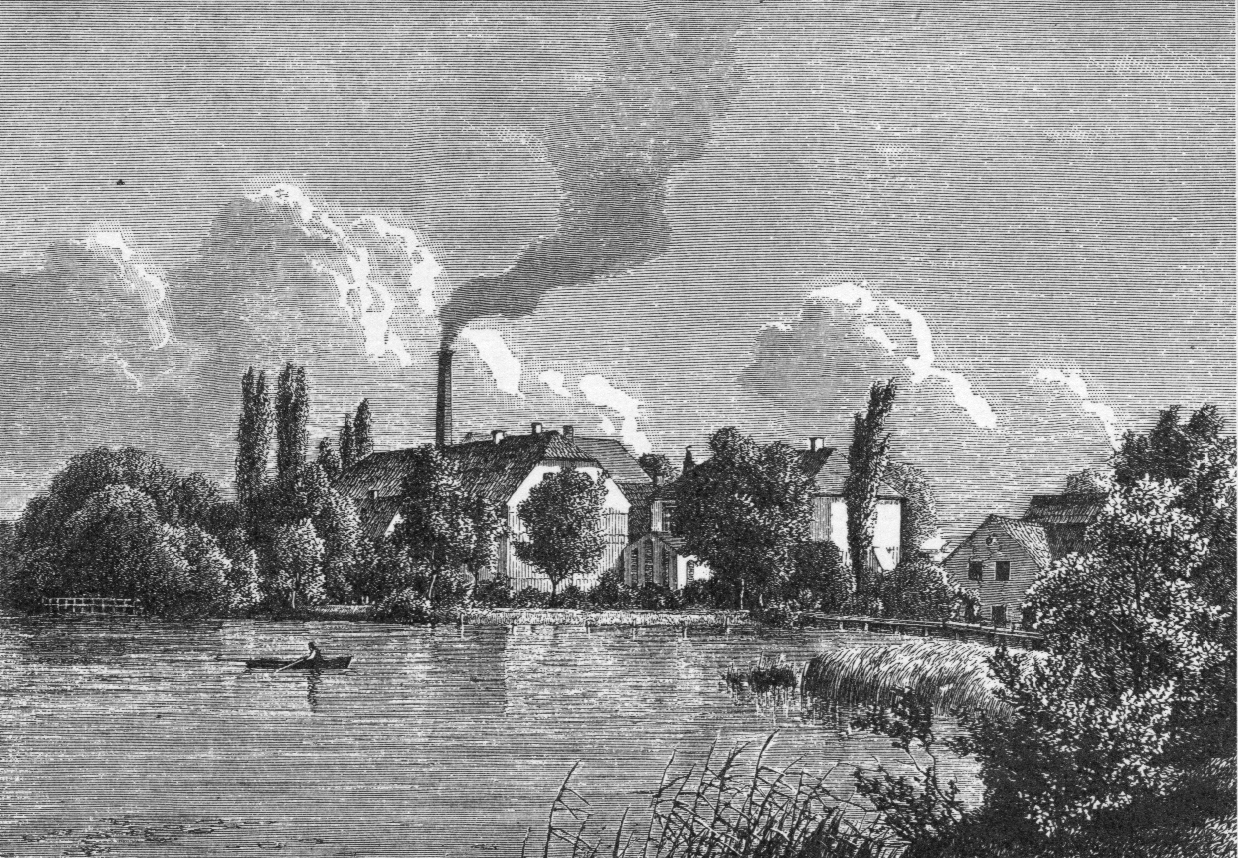
Strandmøllen (1868 print)

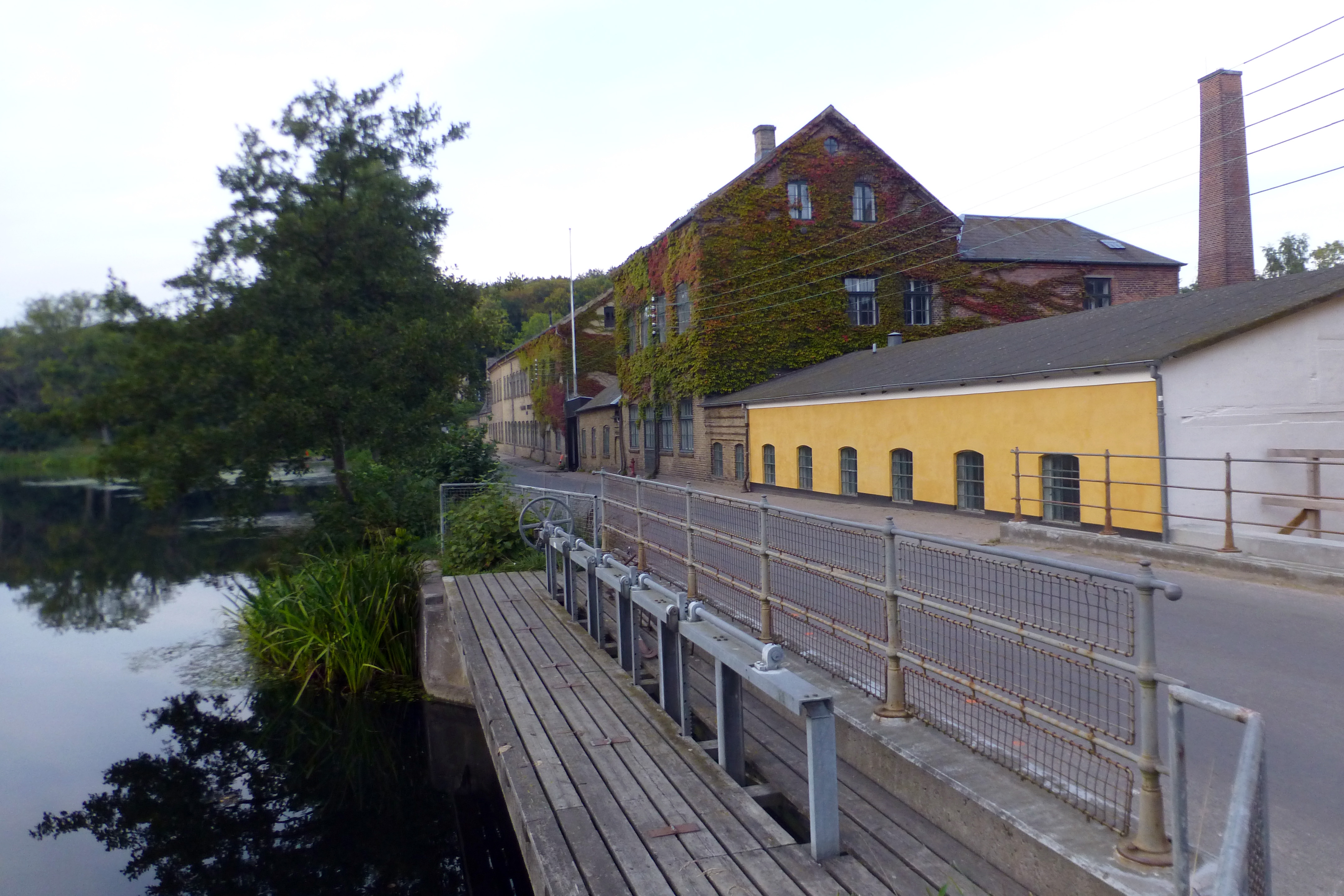
Raadvad

== Canoeing and cycling ==
The river and the adjoining lakes are popular for canoeing. Boats can be rented for the day or for the two-day trip from Frederiksdal to Strandmøllen near the mouth of the river. Boat rental is also available at Holte Harbour. Bådfarten operates four tour boats on Lyngby Sø, Bagsværd Sø and Mølleåen and two on Vejleså and Furesøen. There is also a 10-kilometre (6 mi) walking and cycle route along the river from Sorgenfri to Skodsborg.
