= Karl-Gottfried Prasse =

Danish linguist (1929–2018)

- Born: 14 August 1929; Hamburg, Germany
- Died: 12 April 2018 (aged 88); Værløse, Denmark
- Occupation(s): linguist and professor of Berber and Arab dialects

Karl-Gottfried Prasse (14 August 1929 in Hamburg – 12 April 2018 in Værløse) was a Danish linguist with a focus in the Berber language. He was mainly concerned with the Tuareg-Berber language spoken in Niger, Mali and southern Algeria. For this language, he has authored dictionaries and complete grammar descriptions.

Prasse took lectures in Egyptology in 1956 and was researching Hamito-Semitic languages and specialized early in Berber and Arabic dialects (Cairo dialect) with special focus on Tuareg languages. He served as associate professor of Berber and Arab dialects at the University of Copenhagen from 1969 to 1996.

The school Ecole touarègue de KG Prasse in Amataltal in Niger is named after him. In 2008 he was awarded the Royal Danish Academy of Sciences and Letters' Gold Medal for his research on the Tuareg language.

== Major works ==
- 1972–1973–1974–2009: Manuel de grammaire touarègue (Hoggar dialect) 1–4.
- 1989–1990: Poésies touarègues de l'Ayr, 1) Tuareg text 2) French translation
- 2003: Dictionnaire Touareg-français 1–2 (Älqamus tëmazhëq-tëfränsist)
