= Jonstrup Camp =

Coordinates: 55.754°N 12.347°E

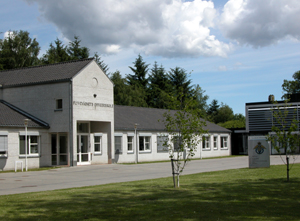
The officers school

The Jonstrup Camp (Danish: Jonstruplejren) is a military installation in Ballerup Municipality in the northwestern outskirts of Copenhagen, Denmark. It is home to the Royal Danish Air Force Officers School, Royal Danish Airforce Library and Forsvarets rekrutering.

== History ==
The Jonstrup Camp was founded 1950 when the Danish Defence acquired the 30 hectares site to build an educational facility for infantry troops. Construction of the buildings began in 1953 to a design similar to that of the nearby military barracks in Farum and Sjælsmark. The area was ceded to the Royal Danish Air Force in 1955, which had been founded on 1 October 1950 through the merger of Hærens Flyvetropper and Søværnets Flyvevæsen. The camp was home to Flyvevåbnets Konstabelskole (1953–1960: Mathskolen; 1977–2000: Flyvevåbnets Specialskole), which moved to Værløse Air Base in 2000. The Royal Danish Air Force Officers School and the Royal Danish Airforce Library has been located in the Jonstrup Camp since 1995. Forsvarets Rekrutering moved to the site in 2003.
