= Værløse Municipality =

Former municipality in Denmark

Coordinates: 55.783°N 12.370°E

Værløse was a municipality (Danish, kommune) consisting of only one parish also named Værløse in the former Copenhagen County on the island of Zealand (Sjælland) in eastern Denmark. The municipality covered an area of 34 km^{2}, and in 2005 had a total population of 18,649. Its last mayor was Jesper Bach, a member of the Venstre (Liberal Party) political party. He was the first mayor of the newly formed Furesø municipality. The community is connected by a road and a motorway and commuter railway to Farum to the north via an isthmus at Fiskebæk between Lake Farum sø and Lake Furesø. The road and motorway run through a small forest on the western shore of Lake Furesø and is almost out of sight and hearing distance from nearby homes in Værløse, but north of the isthmus they run through the town of Farum, separating it in a western and eastern part.

The main town and the site of its municipal council was the town of Værløse. Other towns in the former municipality are Hareskovby, Kirke Værløse, and Jonstrup.

Neighboring municipalities were Farum to the north, Stenløse to the west, Ballerup and Herlev to the south, and Gladsaxe, Lyngby-Taarbæk and Søllerød to the east, albeit the last of these is separated physically from the municipality by the waters of Lake Furesø.

On 1 January 2007 Værløse municipality ceased to exist, as the result of Kommunalreformen ("The Municipal Reform" of 2007). It merged with Farum municipality to form the new Furesø municipality, of which Lake Furesø is the namesake. This created a municipality with an area of 57 km^{2} and a total population of 37,311 (2005). The new municipality belongs to Region Hovedstaden ("Copenhagen Capital Region").

== See also ==
- Værløse station
