= Værløse =

- Town
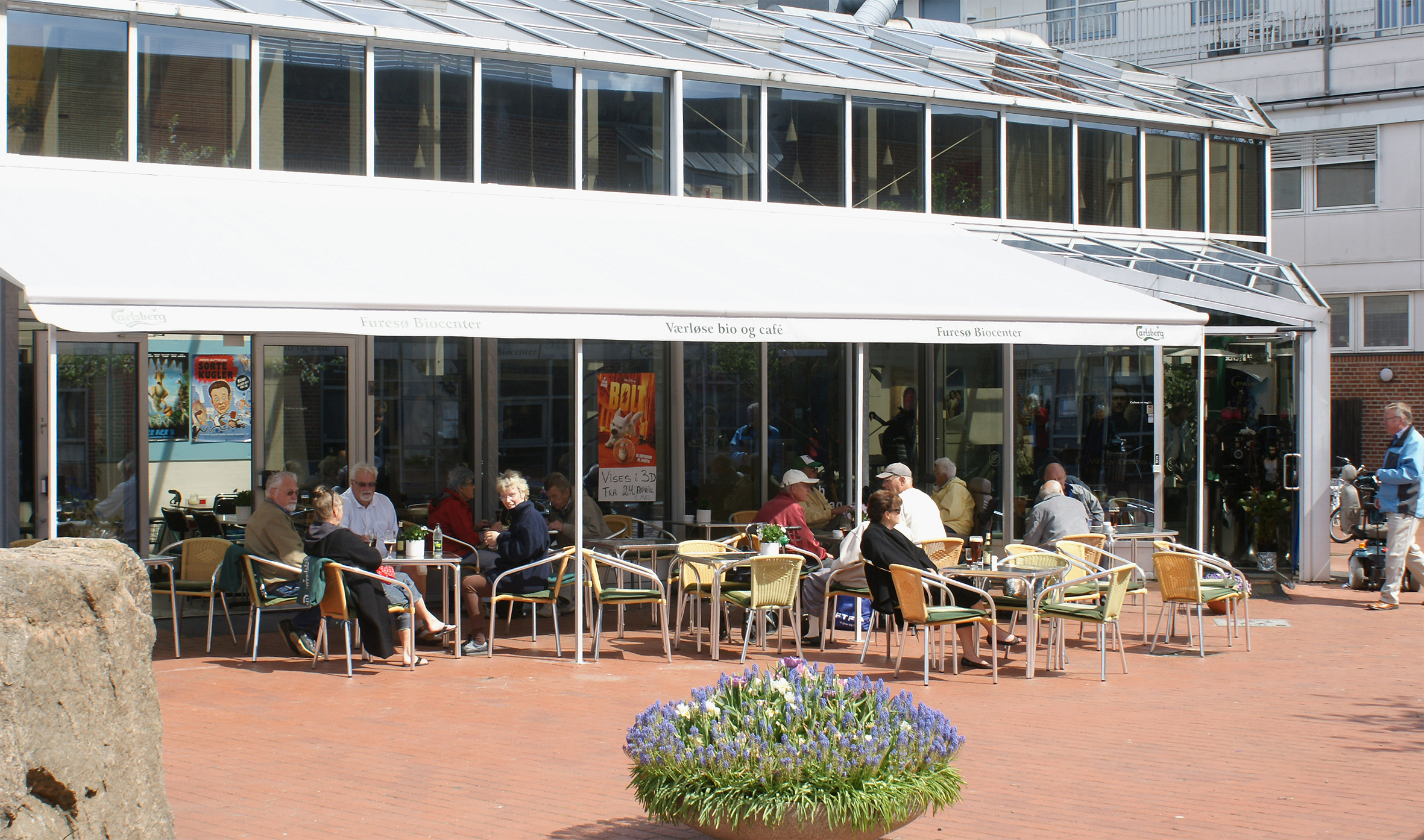
- Værløse Cinema

- Location in Denmark Værløse (Capital Region)
- Coordinates: 55°46′55″N 12°22′23″E
- Country: Denmark
- Region: Capital Region (Hovedstaden)
- Municipality: Furesø

Area
  - Urban: 5.1 km^{2} (2.0 sq mi)

Population (2026)
  - Urban: 13,197
  - Urban density: 2,600/km^{2} (6,700/sq mi)
  - Gender: 6,369 males and 6,828 females
- Time zone: UTC+1 (CET)
  - Summer (DST): UTC+2 (CEST)
- Postal code: 3500

Værløse (Danish pronunciation: [ˈvɛɐ̯ˌløːsə]) is a town in Furesø Municipality in the northwestern outskirts of Copenhagen, Denmark. As of 1 January 2026, it has a population of 13,197. Situated on the west side of the Hillerød Motorway, between Farum Lake to the north and Søndersø Lake to the south, it is surrounded by forest on three sides. Modern Værløse emerged around Værløse station in the 1950s. The original centre of the parish was the village of Kirke Værløse, located three kilometres to the west. The two communities have now almost merged.

== History ==
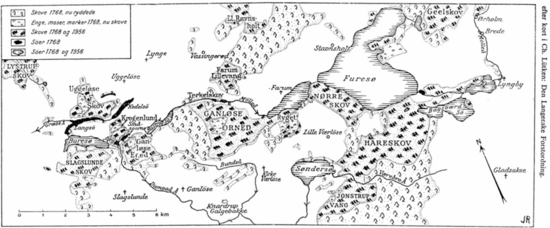
The environs of Værløse in 1736

Kirke Værløse is mentioned in 1321–23 as Vetherløsa maklæ. The meaning of the name is unclear but it may be an old name for the lake Søndersø. The suffix -løse means "area used for grazing in a clearing" (Danish: "græsgang i lysning"). The word maklæ (newer Danish magle) means great or large.

With the opening of the Slangerup Rail Line in 1906, Lille Værløse ("Little Værløse"), a smaller village three kilometres to the east, obtained a more favorable location. Its surroundings was redeveloped with summer houses in the 1940s. DSB took over the Slangerup Rail Line in 1945, shortening it with Farum as the new terminus in 1943. The rapid growth of Copenhagen's suburbs in the 1950s and 1960s also affected Lille Værløse, whose population quintupled between 1950 and 1970.

The civil parish of Værløse formed the basis of Værløse Municipality which existed until 2006. On 1 January 2007 it was merged with the former Farum Municipality to form Furesø Municipality.

== Description ==
Værløse has a small town centre with apartment buildings and a retail center surrounding Værløse station. Furesø Town Hall is located just north of the station. The rest of the town mainly consists of single-family detached homes and terraced housing. Kirke Værløse and Værløse have now almost merged with the establishment of a business district in the western outskirts of Værløse. As of 2023, Kirke Værløse has a population of 992 and covers an area of 0.62 km^{2}, constituting approximately 8% of Værløse's total population.

== Image gallery ==
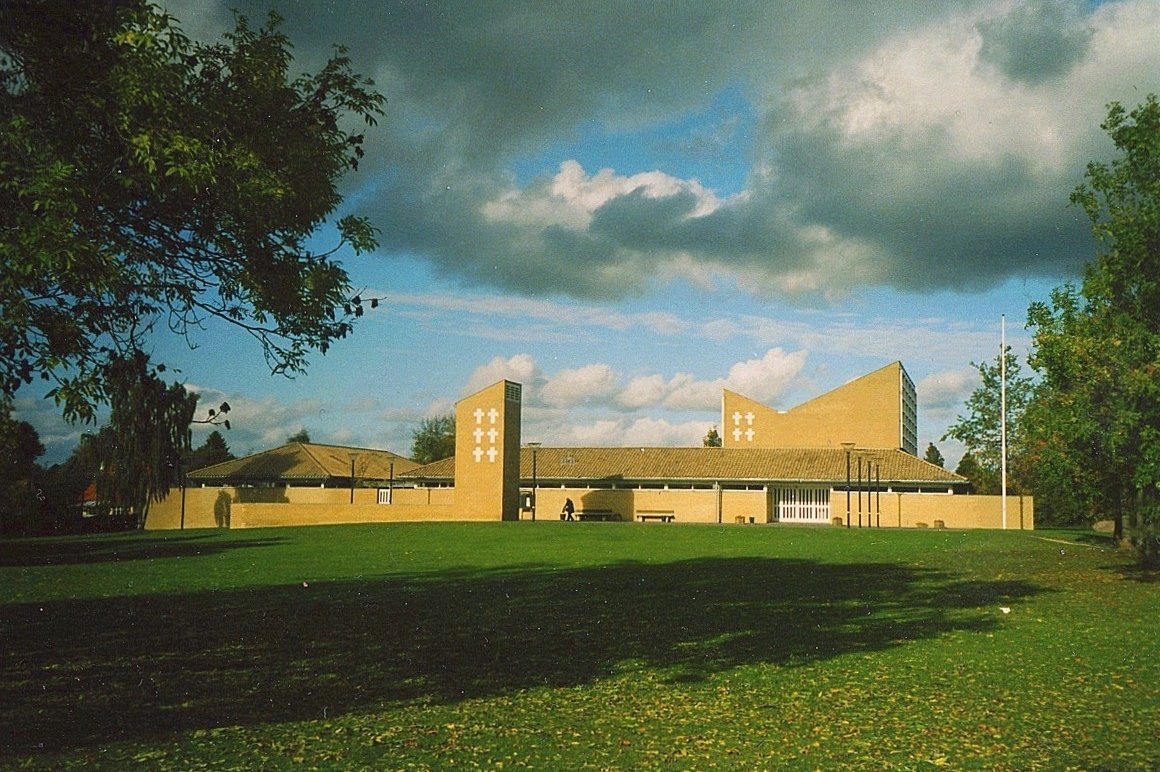
Værløse Church

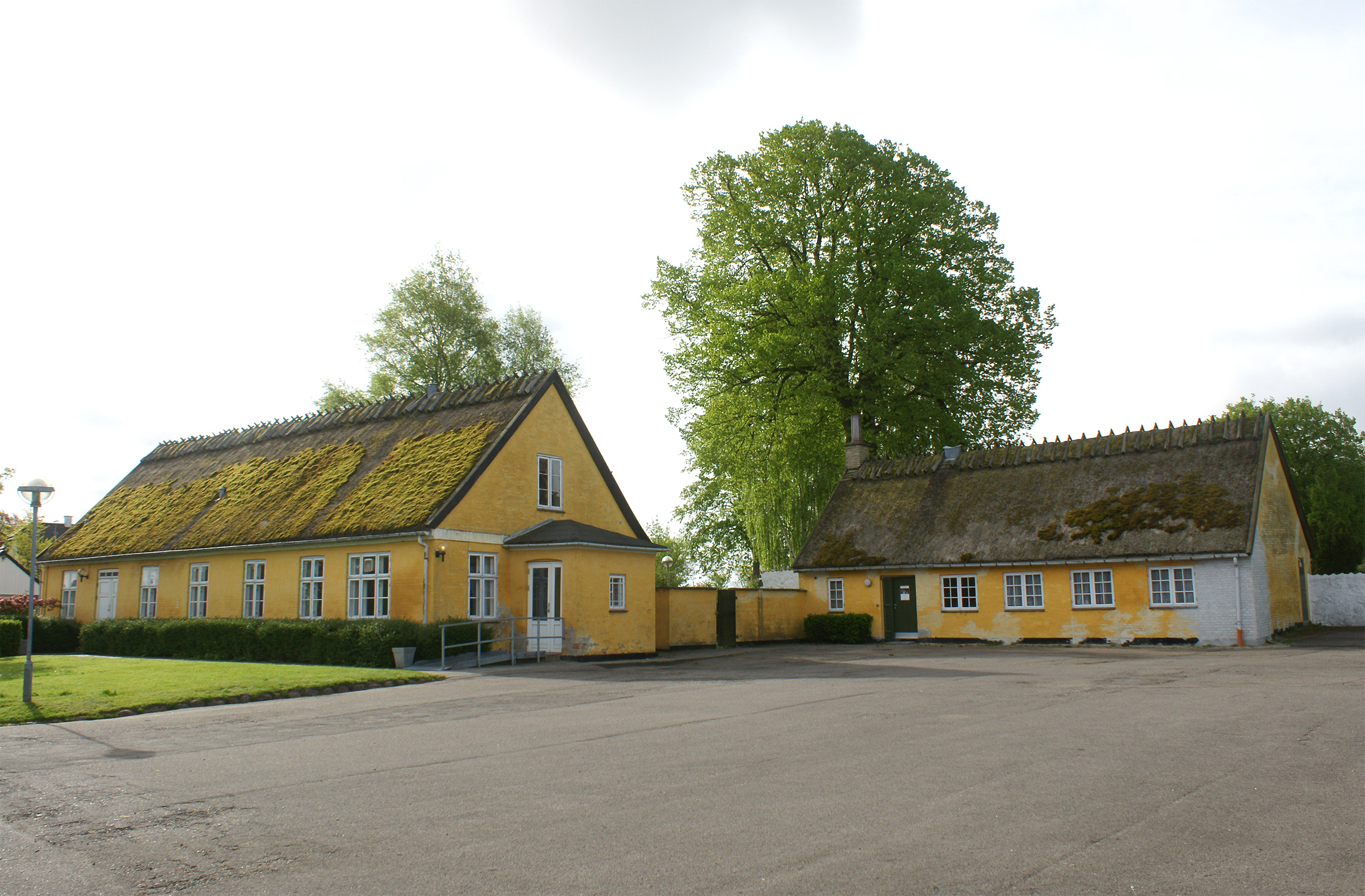
Old houses in Kirke Værløse

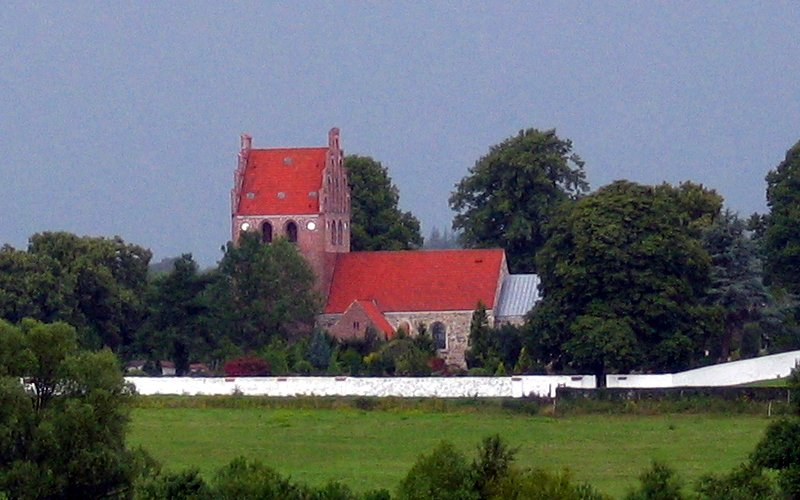
Kirke Værløse Church

== Notable people ==
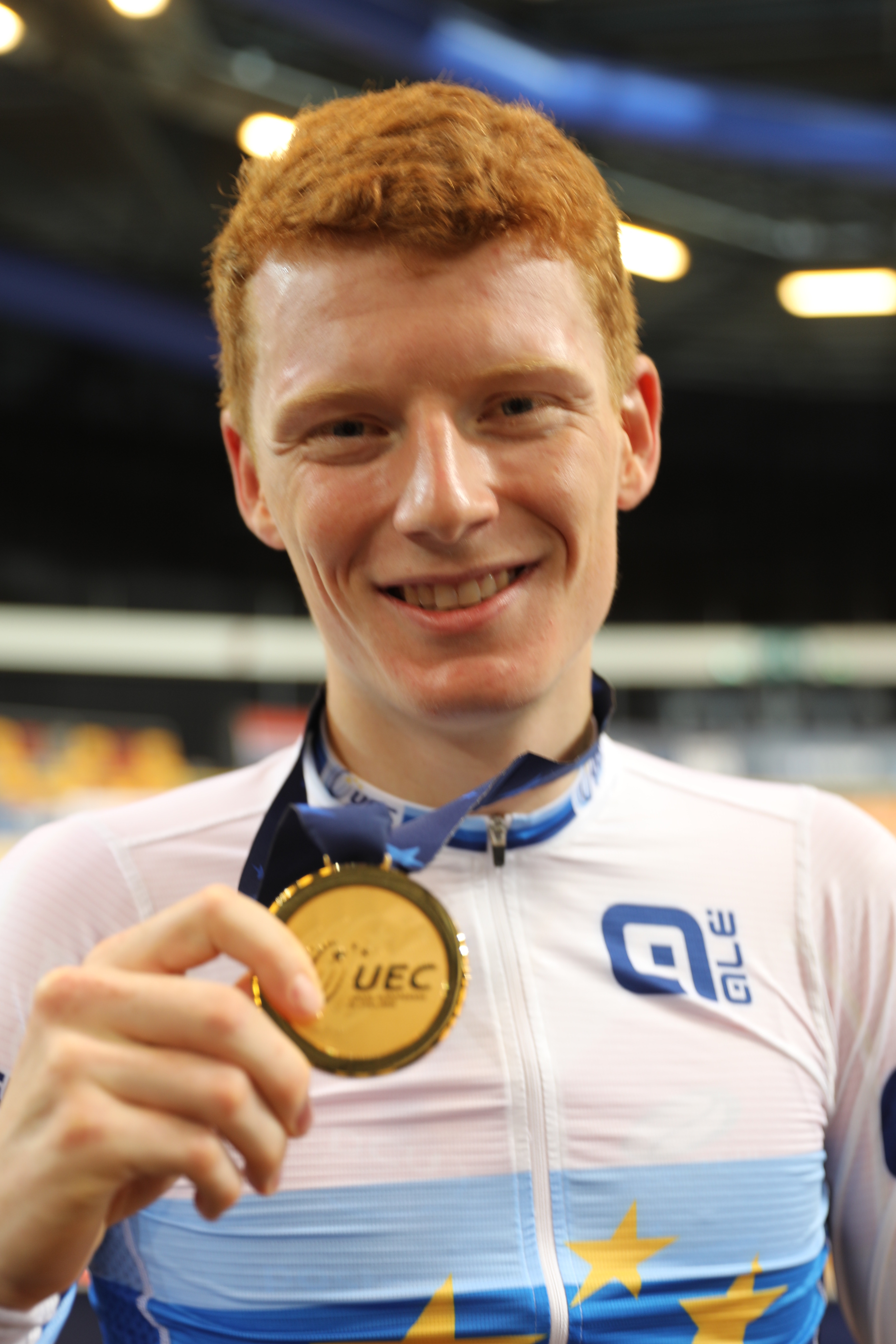
Frederik Rodenberg, 2019

- Karl-Gottfried Prasse (1929 – 2018 in Værløse), a Danish linguist with a focus on the Berber languages, academic at University of Copenhagen from 1969 to 1996
- Annette Mangaard (born 1956 in Lille Vaerlose), a Danish/Canadian filmmaker, artist, writer, director, and producer
- Thomas Bickham (born 1975 in Værløse), a drag queen artist, hairdresser, designer and TV personality
- Kira Marie Peter-Hansen (born 1998), a Danish politician & MEP, grew up in Værløse
- Nik & Jay (formed 2002 in Værløse), Hip-Hop, R&B & Pop music duo

=== Sport ===
- Kurt Stendal (1951 – 2019 in Værløse), a Danish football player with over 325 club cap
- Bent Christensen (born 1963 in Værløse), former footballer, now head coach of Odder IGF
- Mikkel Jensen (born 1977 in Værløse), a retired Danish football player with over 225 club caps
- Martin Albrechtsen (born 1980 in Værløse), a Danish football player with over 450 club caps
- Frederik Rodenberg (born 1998 in Værløse), a Danish professional racing cyclist
- Anne Skelbæk (born 1990), a Danish badminton player from the Værløse badminton club
