= Furesø (lake) =

Lake in Denmark

Furesø Lake
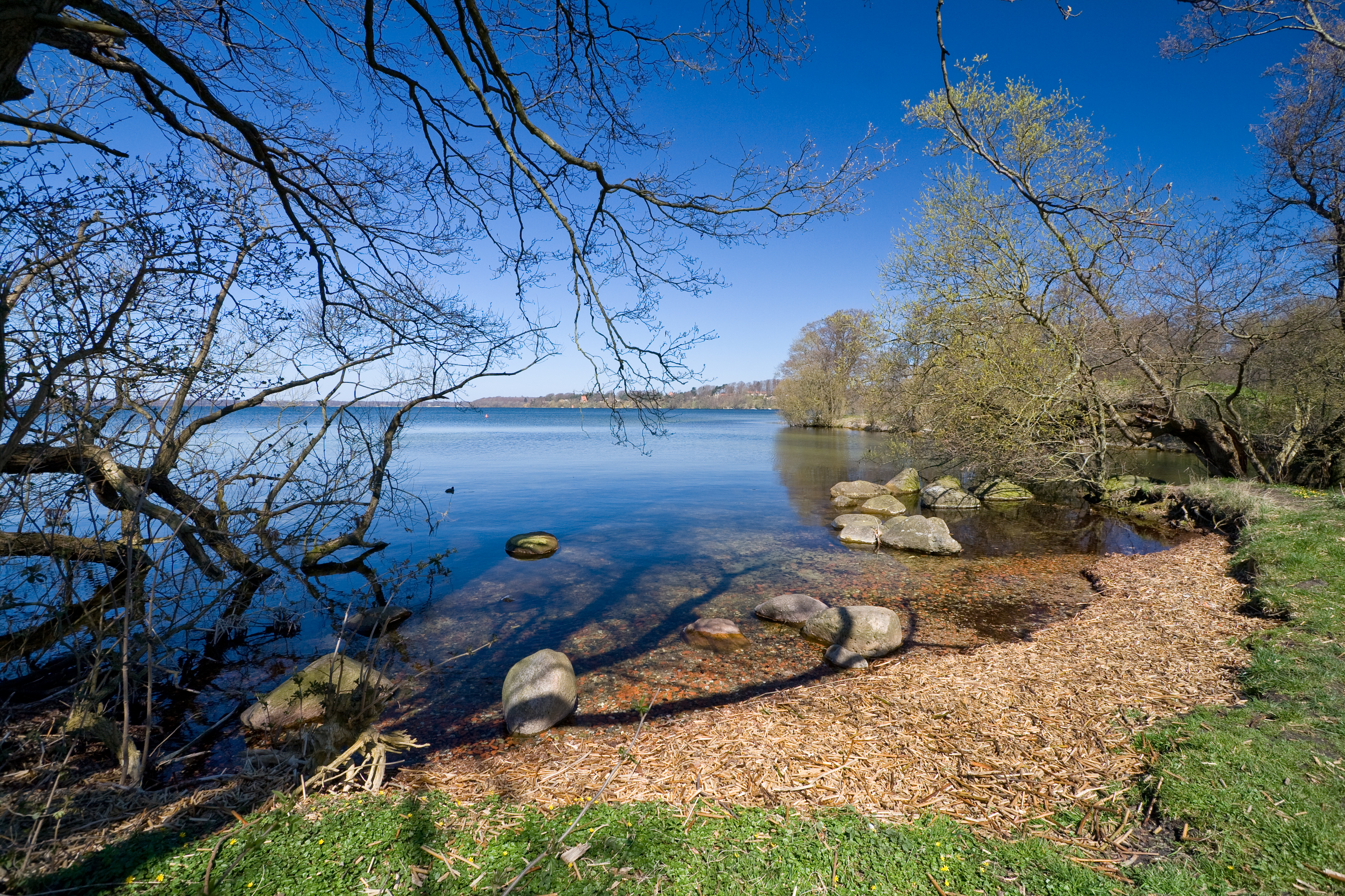

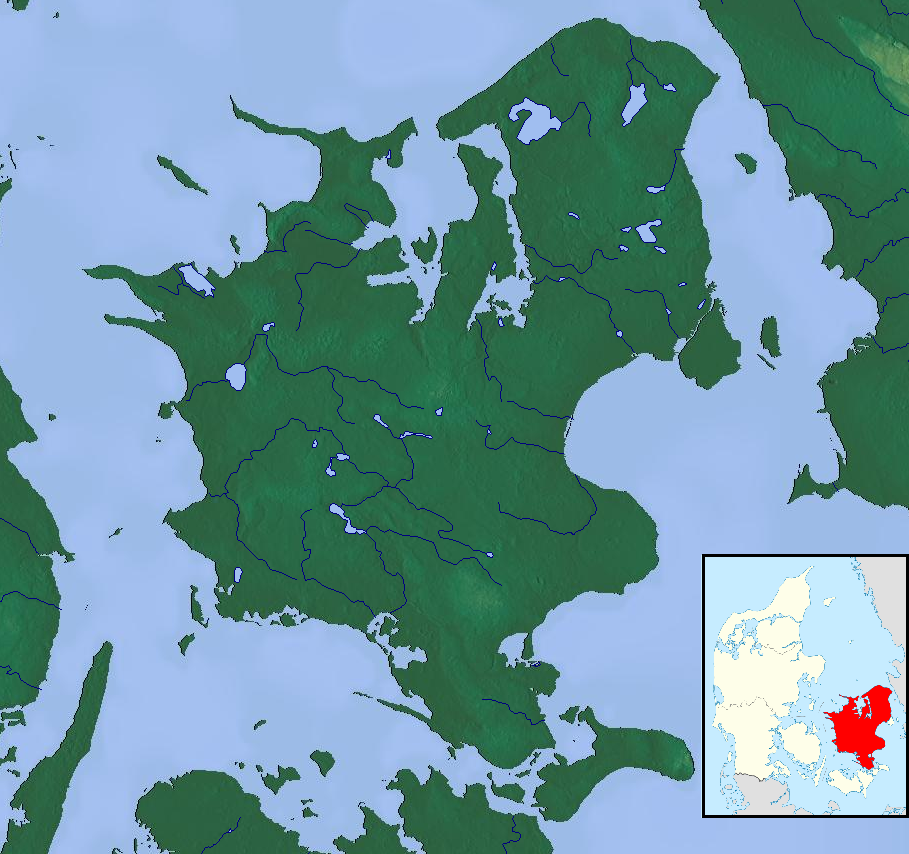
- Location within Zealand
- Location: Northeastern Zealand
- Coordinates: 55°48′N 12°25′E
- Primary inflows: Fiskebæk (Mølleåen), Dumpedalsrenden, Vejlesø Kanal
- Primary outflows: Mølleåen
- Basin countries: Denmark
- Surface area: 941 ha (2,330 acres)
- Max. depth: 37.7 m (124 ft)
- Water volume: 127.1 million cubic metres (103,000 acre⋅ft)
- Surface elevation: 23.50 m (77.1 ft)

Furesø is a fresh water lake in Northeastern Zealand, Denmark and the deepest lake in Denmark. It defined the former Farum municipality's southeastern border and is the site of Nicolai Eigtved's 18th century small pleasure pavilion for Privy Councillor Johan Sigismund Schulin on the Furesø Lake called Frederiksdal Pavilion.

The lake neighbours the adjacent Farum Lake, to which it is connected by a short stream, Fiskebaek.

It is the namesake of Furesø municipality, which was formed January 1, 2007 as a merger of the two former municipalities Farum and Værløse. It has a popular beach on its western shore, which is within the municipality.

== Cultural references ==
Christian Winther's poem Flyv fugl, flyv over Furesøens vand was written while he was a house teacher for the Müffelmanns at the country house Fuglesang.
