= Farum Municipality =

Former municipality in Denmark

Coordinates: 55.813822°N 12.390518°E

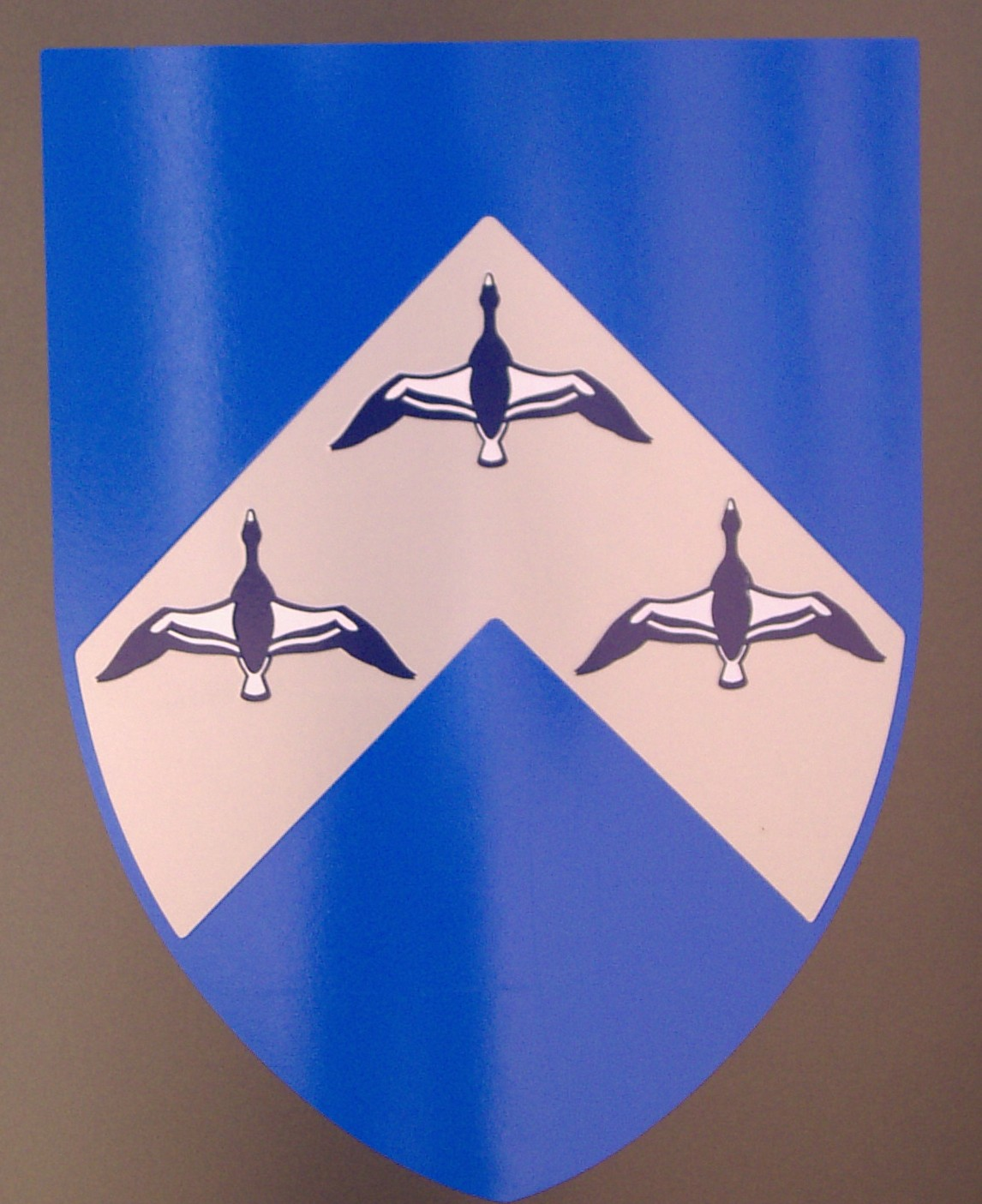
Municipal crest.

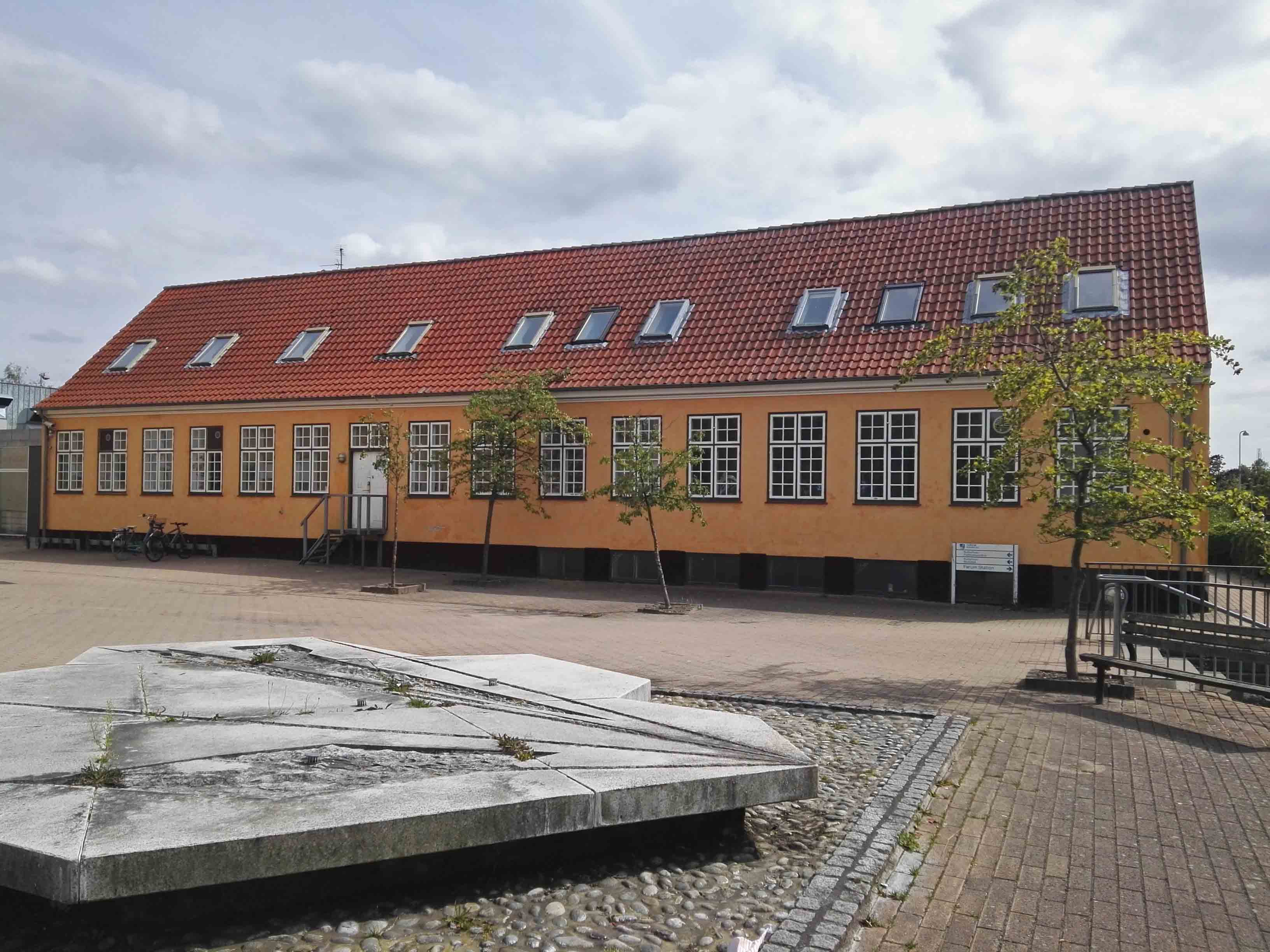
The old municipal school served as part of the city hall.

Farum municipality was a municipality (Danish kommune) in the northeast of the island of Zealand in eastern Denmark. On 1 January 2007 it merged with Værløse municipality to form the new Furesø municipality as a consequence of Denmark's Municipal Reform.

== Geography ==
The municipality had a population of 18,662 (2005), covered an area of 23 km^{2} (8.9 sq mi), and was, according to size, the smallest municipality of Frederiksborg County.

The main town and the site of its municipal council was Farum. Other villages were Bregnerød and Stavnsholt.

Neighboring municipalities were Birkerød to the east, Allerød to the north, Stenløse to the southwest and Værløse to the south. The municipality Søllerød to the southeast was separated from Farum by the lake Furesø. Most of Farum's border to Værløse was made up by the lake Farum Sø, except for a short isthmus at Fiskebæk.

Between the two lakes of Farum Sø and Furesø, along the isthmus, runs a north–south traffic corridor with motorway, road and railway. This corridor effectively divides the former municipality in two sections, called Farum East and Farum West, which are only connected by bridges across the motorway.

== History ==
In 1901 Farum had 1,200 inhabitants. In the early 1950s the population was ca. 4000. Through the 1960s and 1970s the community turned into a commuter town due to its proximity to Copenhagen and the population expanded past 10,000. By 1980 the population was over 16,000.

in 1952 Farum and other municipalities close to Copenhagen were granted a city-like status. Although the municipality consisted of only one parish, it was not affected by the municipal reform of 1970.

=== Farum scandal ===
The longtime mayor Peter Brixtofte was involved in a financial scandal that became the focus of national scrutiny in 2002. He was forced to resign after being implicated in a variety of corruption. He had been mayor since 1985 and had presided over what first appeared as a successful revitalization of the community with extended public services, including the establishment of a large sports arena, under-cover grants to the local football association, and "well-being trips", free holiday trips to the Mediterranean for senior citizens. Brixtofte's policy of forcing the unemployed to work in return for benefits was first controversial but has since become a nationwide rule. Another way of creating funds was to sell off public services and lease them back. In June 2006 Brixtofte was sentenced to two years prison.

After Brixtofte's economic schemes went bust, Farum had to raise its municipal tax drastically. The neighbouring municipality of Værløse protested against being merged with Farum, as the government had proposed. Eventually the merger took place but a unique arrangement was granted, allowing the two parts of the new municipality to maintain separate tax rates, and a special government subsidy of 2,000 million DKK (350 million USD), paid over the next 15 years. Other municipalities with greater economic difficulties protested against this. Also, a newly closed air force air base (Flyvestation Værløse) was given to Furesø municipality to own and perhaps turn into a recreational area.

Farum's last mayor was Lars Carpens who had replaced Brixtofte in 2002. Both were members of Venstre (Liberal Party).

== See also ==
- Farum railway station
