= Furesø Municipality =

Furesø Municipality Furesø Kommune (Danish)
- Municipality
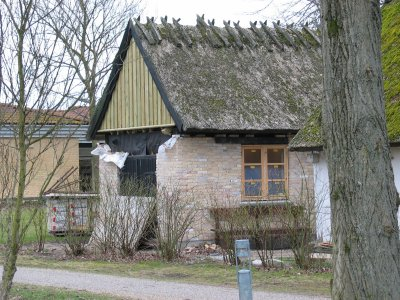
- Værløse Museum

- Flag Coat of arms

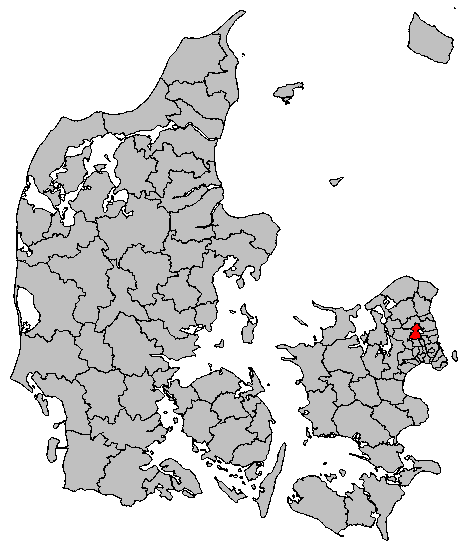
- Coordinates: 55°47′44″N 12°22′27″E
- Country: Denmark
- Region: Hovedstaden
- Established: 1 January 2007
- Seat: Værløse

Government
  - Mayor: Ole Bondo Christensen (S)

Area
  - Total: 56.81 km^{2} (21.93 sq mi)

Population (1 January 2026)
  - Total: 42,874
  - Density: 754.7/km^{2} (1,955/sq mi)
- Time zone: UTC+1 (CET)
  - Summer (DST): UTC+2 (CEST)
- Municipal code: 190
- Website: www.furesoe.dk

Furesø Municipality (Danish: Furesø Kommune) is a municipality (Danish: kommune) in Denmark. It has a population of 42,874 (1 January 2026) and a total area of 55.68 km^{2} (21.50 sq.mi.) with water and forest making up around 10 and 15 km^{2}, respectively. The municipality belongs to the Copenhagen Capital Region and lies 20 km northwest of Copenhagen. Its mayor is Ole Bondo Christensen, a member of the Social Democrats (Socialdemokraterne) political party. It is a municipality with much forest and access to several lakes, of which it is named after the largest, Furesøen, which has a popular beach with rest rooms, a small candy/ice shop and in addition sportsboat (competition) clubs and a restaurant open all year.

== Værløse Air Base ==
In September 2008, it was decided by the Ministry of the Environment that Flyvestation Værløse, a former air base - Denmark's first - situated 17 km from the City Hall square of Copenhagen and offered to the municipality to own, would be granted legally protected status from extensive real estate exploitation. This decision was appealed and The Environmental Board of Appeal (Natur- og Miljøklagenævnet) in 2009 overturned this decision. Before being given to the municipality to own, the Ministry of Defence sold some of the approximately 440 hectares of land to developers of private homes. Most of the former air base has since been made into an open air recreational area. A movie/media production company is located there. This offer (to own the former air base) was a consequence of the actions by the former mayor of Farum Municipality Peter Brixtofte, who was imprisoned in 2008.

== Transport ==
The last three stations, namely Hareskov, Værløse and the terminus Farum, of one S-train commuter train line from Copenhagen are located in the municipality. The terminus at the other end of this line is Høje Taastrup. The Greater Copenhagen Light Rail being built in the suburbs and inaugurated in 2025 runs between Lyngby-Taarbæk Municipality to the north and Ishøj Municipality to the south parallel to but outside the municipal border of Copenhagen Municipality but will not (for now) have a station (on another, parallel line) in Furesø municipality.

== History ==
It was established as a merger of the former municipalities of Farum in Frederiksborg County and Værløse in Copenhagen County on 1 January 2007 as a consequence of the Municipal Reform. The counties (Danish plural amtskommuner, singular amtskommune, literally county municipality) were abolished 1 January 2007 and replaced by regions, which are not municipalities.

== Settlements ==
Farum	20,199
Værløse	13,022
Hareskovby	3,751
Jonstrup	1,276
Kirke Værløse	982
Laanshøj	657

Population numbers as of 1 January 2021.

== Politics ==
=== Municipal council ===
Furesø's municipal council consists of 21 members, elected every four years.

Below are the municipal councils elected since the Municipal Reform of 2007.

Election	Party											Total seats	Turnout	Elected mayor
Election	A	B	C	F	I	O	P	Q	U	V	Ø	Total seats	Turnout	Elected mayor
2005	6	1	3	2			1		1	10	1	25	81.8%	Jesper Bach (V)
2009	8	1	4	2		1		1		4		21	74.8%	Ole Bondo Christensen (A)
2013	10	1	3			1				5	1	21	79.1%	Ole Bondo Christensen (A)
2017	10	1	3		1	1				4	1	21	76.4%	Ole Bondo Christensen (A)
Data from Kmdvalg.dk 2005, 2009, 2013 and 2017

== See also ==
- Listed buildings in Furesø Municipality
