= Sorgenfri railway station =

Railway station in Lyngby-Taarbæk Municipality, Denmark

Sorgenfri
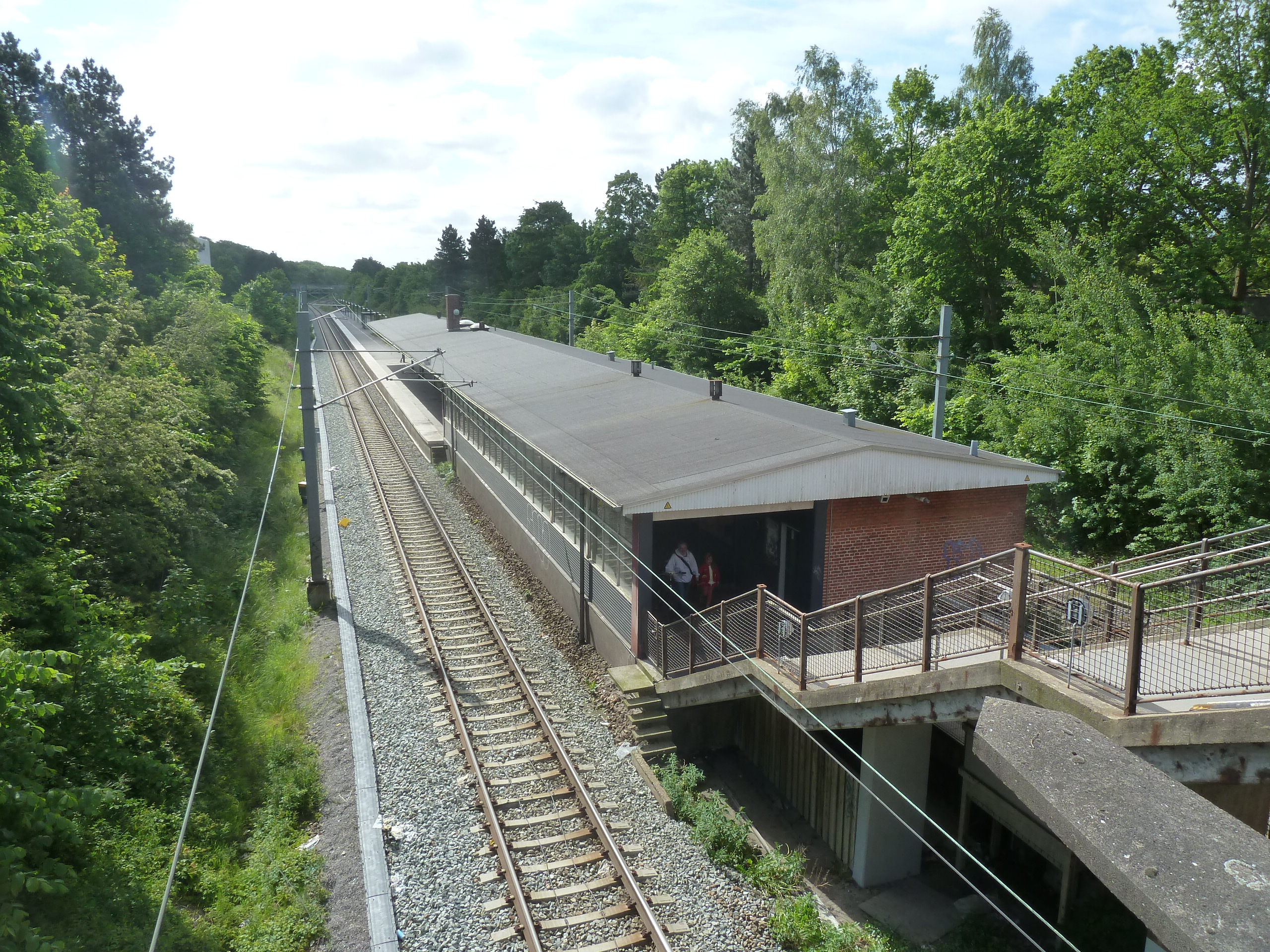
- Sorgenfri station in 2012

General information
- Location: 51 Hummeltoftevej; 2830 Virum; Lyngby-Taarbæk Municipality; Denmark
- Coordinates: 55°46′52.8″N 12°29′00″E
- Elevation: 30.0 metres (98.4 ft)
- Owner: DSB (station infrastructure); Banedanmark (rail infrastructure)
- Line: North Line
- Platforms: Island platform
- Tracks: 2
- Train operators: DSB

History
- Opened: 1936

Services
Preceding station	S-train	Following station
Virum towards Holte	E Mon–Fri	Lyngby towards Køge
Virum towards Hillerød	A Sat–Sun	Lyngby towards Køge
Location

Sorgenfri station is a railway station on the Hillerød radial of the S-train network in Copenhagen, Denmark. It serves Sorgenfri and the southern part of Virum. It is located at Hummeltoftevej 51 and is named for the nearby Sorgenfri palace.

== History ==
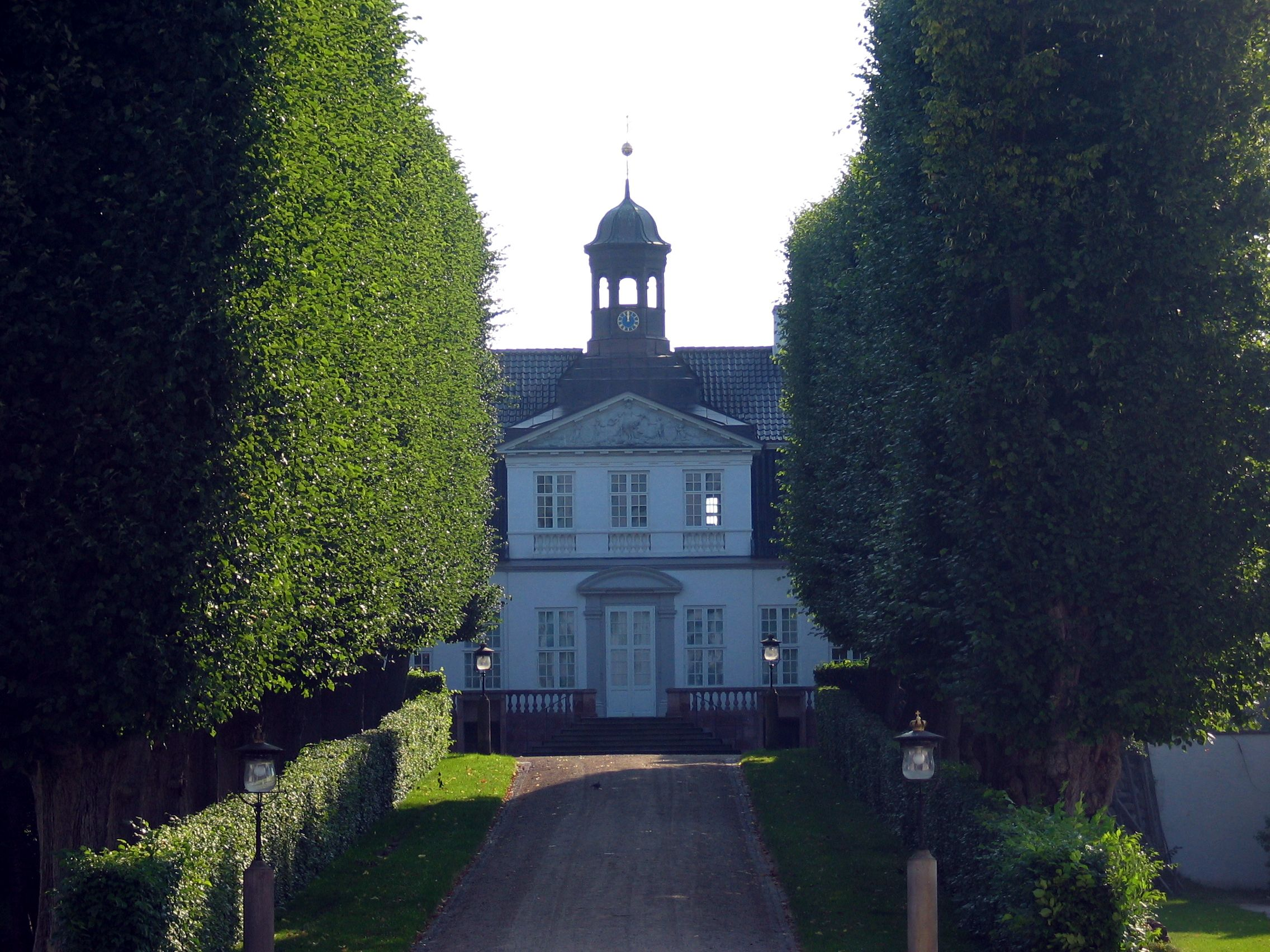
Sorgenfri Palace, former residence of the Danish monarch, is less than a kilometre east of the station.

The station was established in 1936 in connection with the conversion of Nordbanen into an S-train line. The station opened on 15 May 1936. It was then located at present-day Lottenborgvej which was then called Hummeltoftevej and crossed the railway on a bridge.

The station was moved 250 metres (820 ft) to the northwest in connection with the construction of the Lyngby Bypass in 1955. Hummeltoftevej was also moved north and the old road was renamed Lottenborgvej after the property Lottenborg.

== See also ==
- List of Copenhagen S-train stations
- List of railway stations in Denmark
- Rail transport in Denmark
- History of rail transport in Denmark
- Transport in Copenhagen
- Transport in Denmark
