= Helt =

Helt may refer to:-

- Helt Township, Vermillion County, Indiana

== People with the name ==
- Cheri Helt, United States politician from Oregon
- John Helt, Danish soccer player
