= Lottenborg =

- Lottenborg
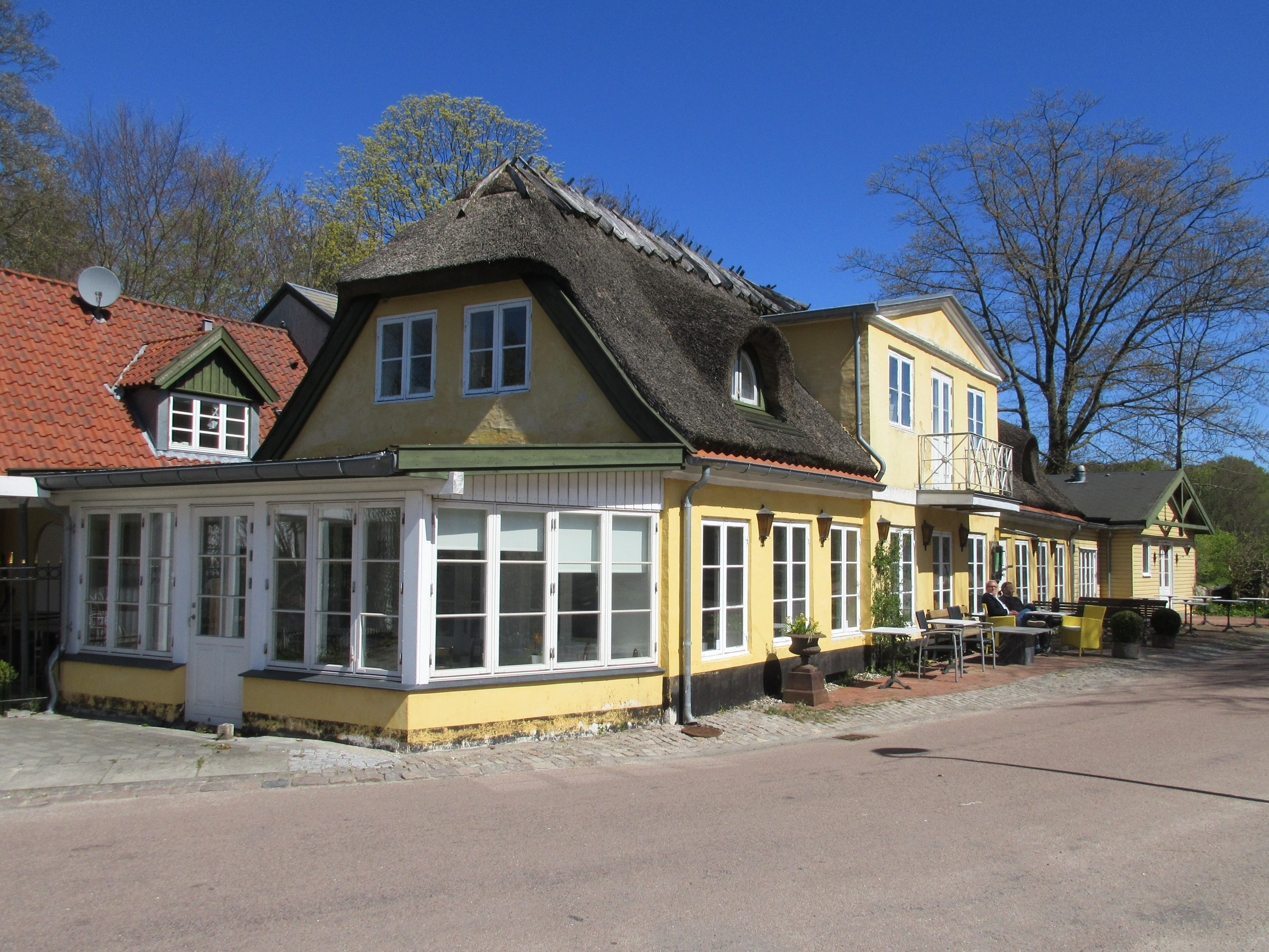
- Lottenborg in 2017.
- Interactive map of the Lottenborg area

General information
- Location: Sorgenfri, Lyngby-Taarbæk Municipality, Denmark
- Coordinates: 55°46′45″N 12°29′28″E

Website
- www.lottenborgkro.dk

Lottenborg is an 18th-century roadside inn located next to Sorgenfri Cemetery in Sorgenfri, Lyngby-Taarbæk Municipality, in the northern suburbs of Copenhagen, Denmark. It is situated on Lottenborgvej (No. 14), a side street to Lyngby Kongevej located opposite Sorgenfri Palace. The building is still used as a restaurant but is only open for lunch Thursday through Sunday.

== History ==
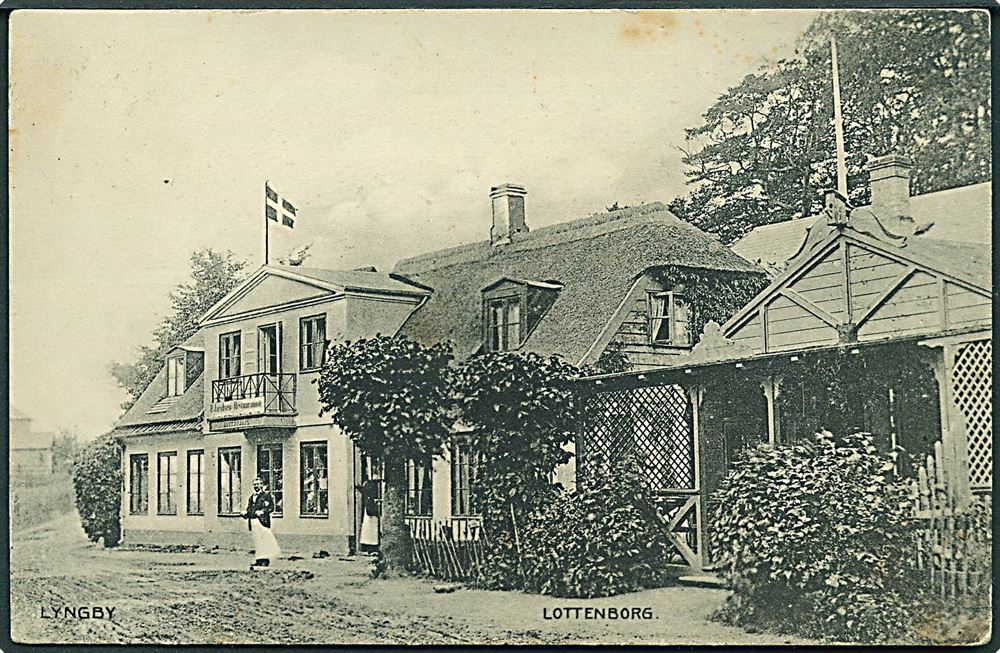
Lottenborg

The house is located at the site of a former boom gate across the old road from Lyngby Kongevej to Frederiksdal and belonged to the gatekeeper (vangemanden). The village of Virum's pastures began at the site and the gate was to keep cattle from passing onto the main road. The house was known as Vangehuset or ”"Hop-ind" ("Stop-By" and the gatekeeper worked at Sorgenfri Palace. It was the residence of Frederick, Hereditary Prince of Denmark and Princess Sophie Frederikke. The gatekeeper's house was renamed Lottenborg after their daughter, Charlotte, who was born in 1789. Her older brother, Frederik Christian, was the later Christian VIII. In 1810, Princess Charlotte married Prince William of Hesse-Kassel. Their daughter, Louise, married Prince Christian of Glücksburg who as Christian IX became the first Danish king from the House of Glücksburg in 1851.

In the 19th century, Lottenborg became a popular roadside restaurant and excursion destination. Hans Christian Andersen, B. S. Ingemann and Hans Christian Ørsted are supposedly among the peers who have frequented the site. The name of the road was changed from Frederiksdalvej to Hummeltoftevej when the new Frederiksdalvej opened in 1934. The road crossed the railway on a bridge when the new Nordbanen opened in 1863. The bridge was renewed when Sorgenfri station was established in connection into an S-train line in the early 1930s. As traffic increased on Hummeltoftevej, it was proposed to demolish Lottenborg to make way for a widening of the road but it was instead decided to construct a new road section which continued directly in the new road Skovbrunet on the other side of Lyngby Kongevej. A new Sorgenfri station was also built and the old bridge across the railway was replaced by a footbridge. The old road section between the Lyngby Kongevej and the bridge was renamed Lottenborgvej. The road section on the other side of the bridge became part of I. H. Mundts Vej.

For many years, Lottenborg belonged to the restaurateur Ernst Høegh-Hansen and then his widow Agnete who died in 1993. She left Lottenborg to Lyngby-Taarbæk Municipality. The municipality initially leased it out to successive restaurateurs but sold it in 2011.

== Today ==
Lottenborg Kro is open Thursday through Sunday for lunch.
