= Siegfried Wagner (sculptor) =

Danish sculptor (1874–1952)

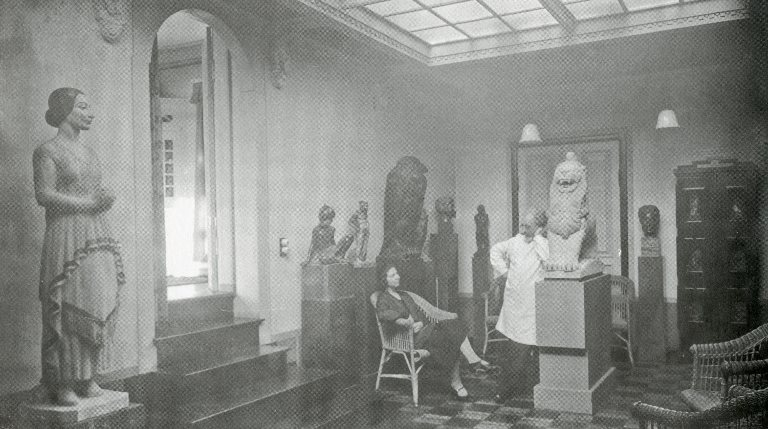
- Siegfried with one of his daughters in his home in Kongens Lyngby
- Born: 13 April 1874; Hamburg, Germany
- Died: 1 August 1952 (aged 78); Kongens Lyngby, Denmark
- Education: Royal Danish Academy of Fine Arts
- Known for: Sculpture and design
- Spouse: Olga Wagner

Siegfried Wagner (13 April 1874 – 1 August 1952) was a Danish sculptor.

== Early life and education ==
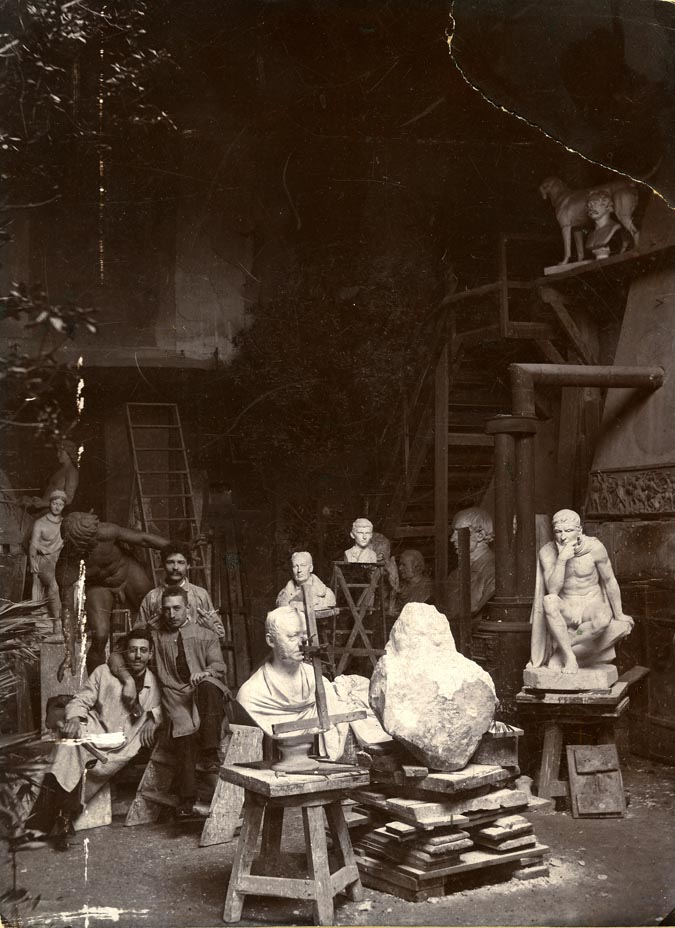
Vilhelm Bissen's studio in 1893: Siegfried Wagner in the foreground, then Johan Einar Otto and Georg Jensen to the rear

Wagner was born to Jewish–Danish parents on 13 April 1874 in Hamburg. His father was plumber Joseph Meyer Wagner and his mother was Julie Philipsen. He was adopted by his uncle Julius Jacob Heine and Frederikke Wagner in 1892. The family lived in Kongens Lyngby, Denmark.

Wagner attended the Royal Danish Academy of Fine Arts in 1889–96. He married Olga Wagner in 1899.

== Career ==
Wagner worked for some time in Vilhelm Bissen's studio and under J.F. Willumsen at Bing & Grøndahl. Wagner worked as a teacher at Tegne- og Kunstindustriskolen for Kvinder in 1898–1900.

Wagner and Mogens Ballin created a metal workshop in Copenhagen in 1900. In May 1902, Wagner created approximately 65 designs before leaving the workshop in 1902 to assume a position as artistic director of Tvermoes & Abrahamsen's Chandelier Factory.

Wagner was represented at Den Frie Udstilling from 1905. He won the Grand Prix at the World Expo in Paris in 1906.

He died on 1 August 1952 and was buried in Sorgenfri Cemetery (the grave has been removed).

== Løveborg ==
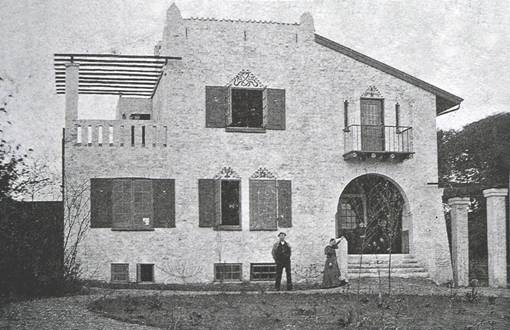
Løveborg in Lyngby

Sigfried and Olga Wagner lived with his foster parents in their Villa Ricca on Lottenborgvej in Kongens Lyngby from circa 1900. They purchased the house in 1910. The house was built in 1898 to a design by Carl Brummer but later adapted and richly decorated by the two artists. It was after their acquisition known as Løveborg.

== Legacy ==
Wagner's most well-known work is the Lur Blowers on the City Hall Square in Copenhagen. He has also created the Swan Fountain in Varde and a bronze cast of his 1914 bust of Tyge Brahe was installed at the Round Tower in Copenhagen in 1932.

His works for Bing & Grøndahl include the Fleurs de Lotus and Polichinelle vases, both of which were created for the 1900 Exposition Universelle in Paris and later gifted to Copenhagen City Hall where they are now on display in the Banquet Hall.

In 2006, Vejen Art Museum exhibited works by Olga and Siegfried Wagner, including sculptures, furniture, ceramics, silver and artefacts in wood.

== List of selected works ==
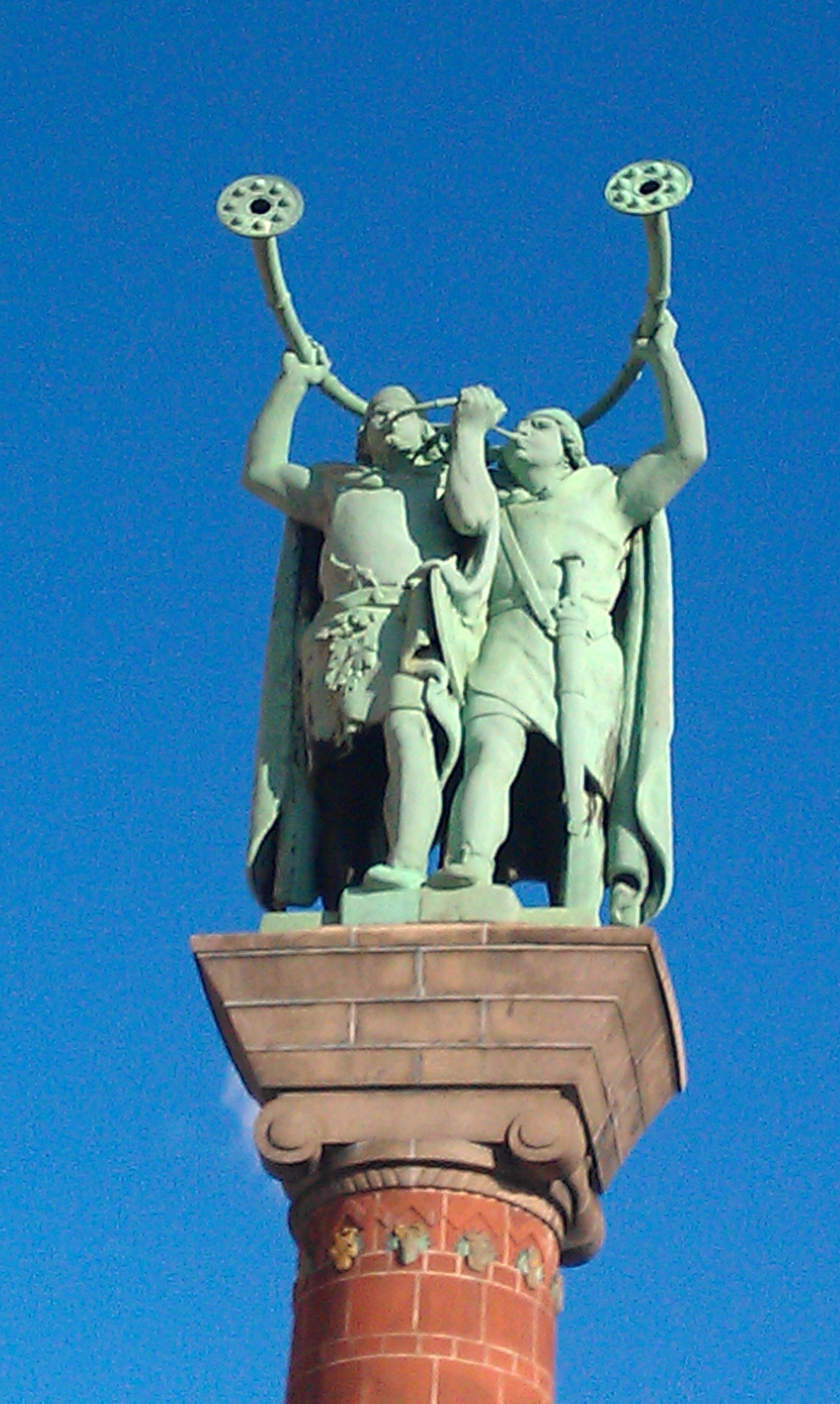
Lur Blowers, Regnbuepladsen, Copenhagen.

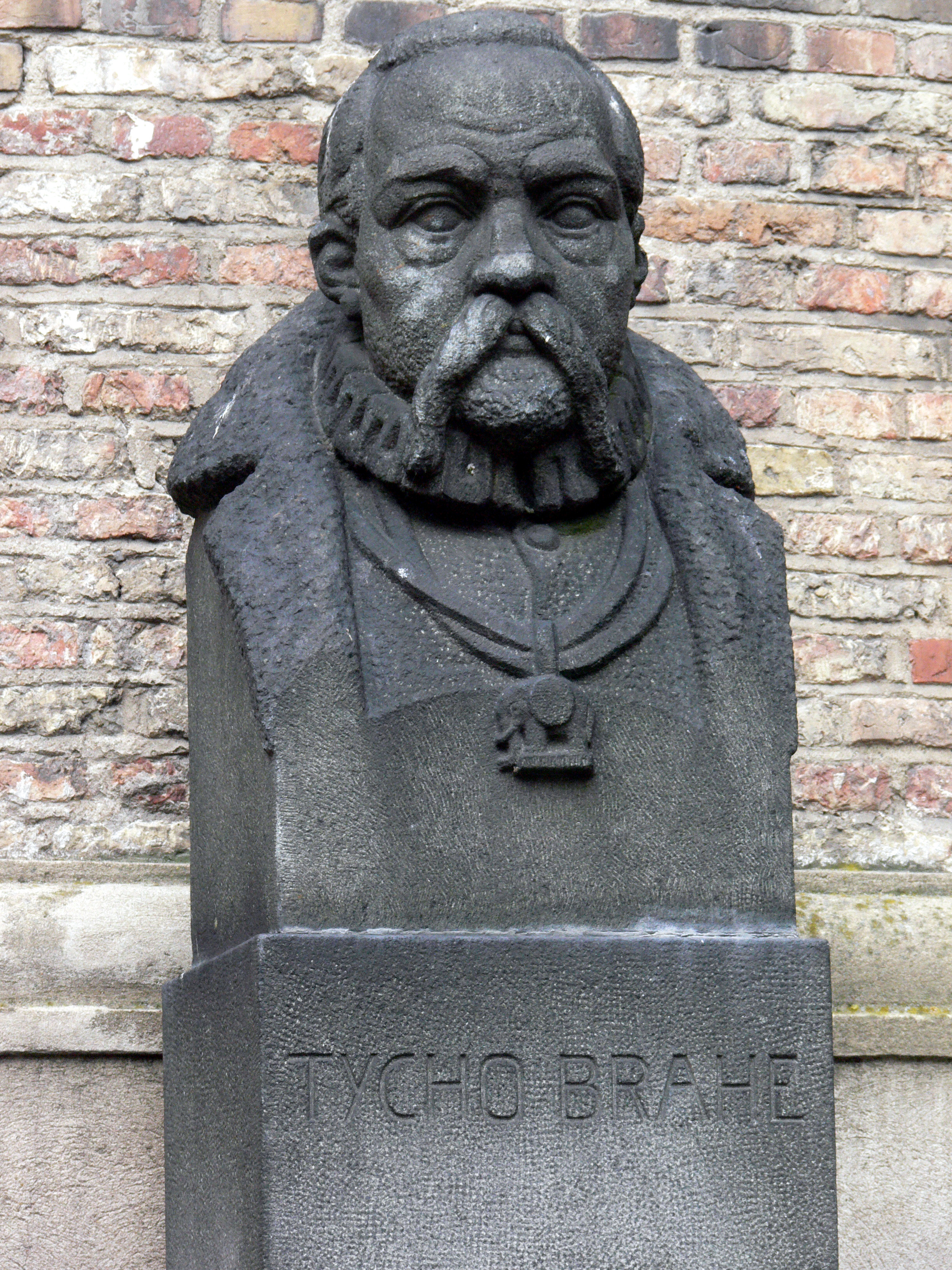
Tycho Brahe, Round Tower, Copenhagen.

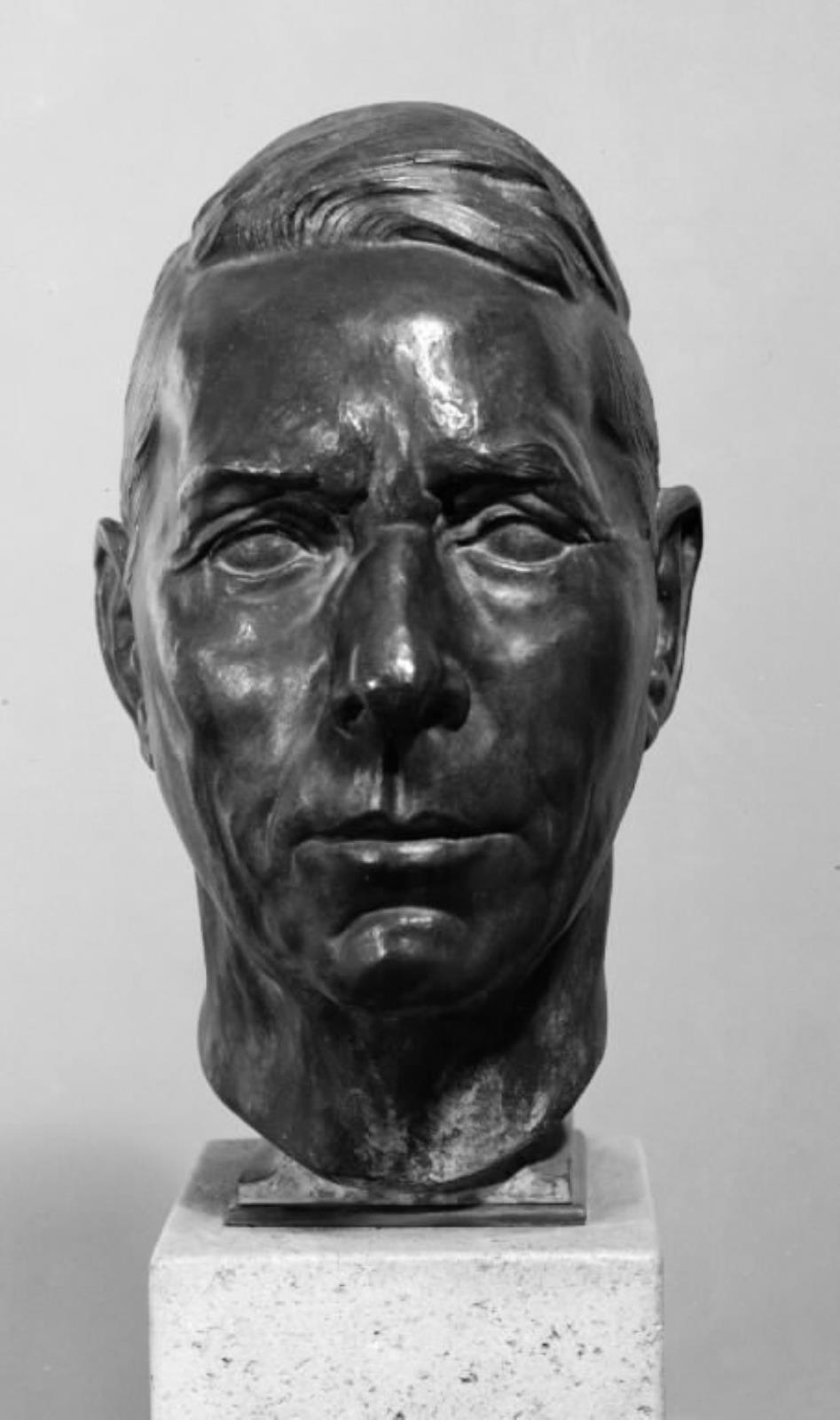
Forfatteren Johannes V. Jensen, 1933, Danish National Gallery.

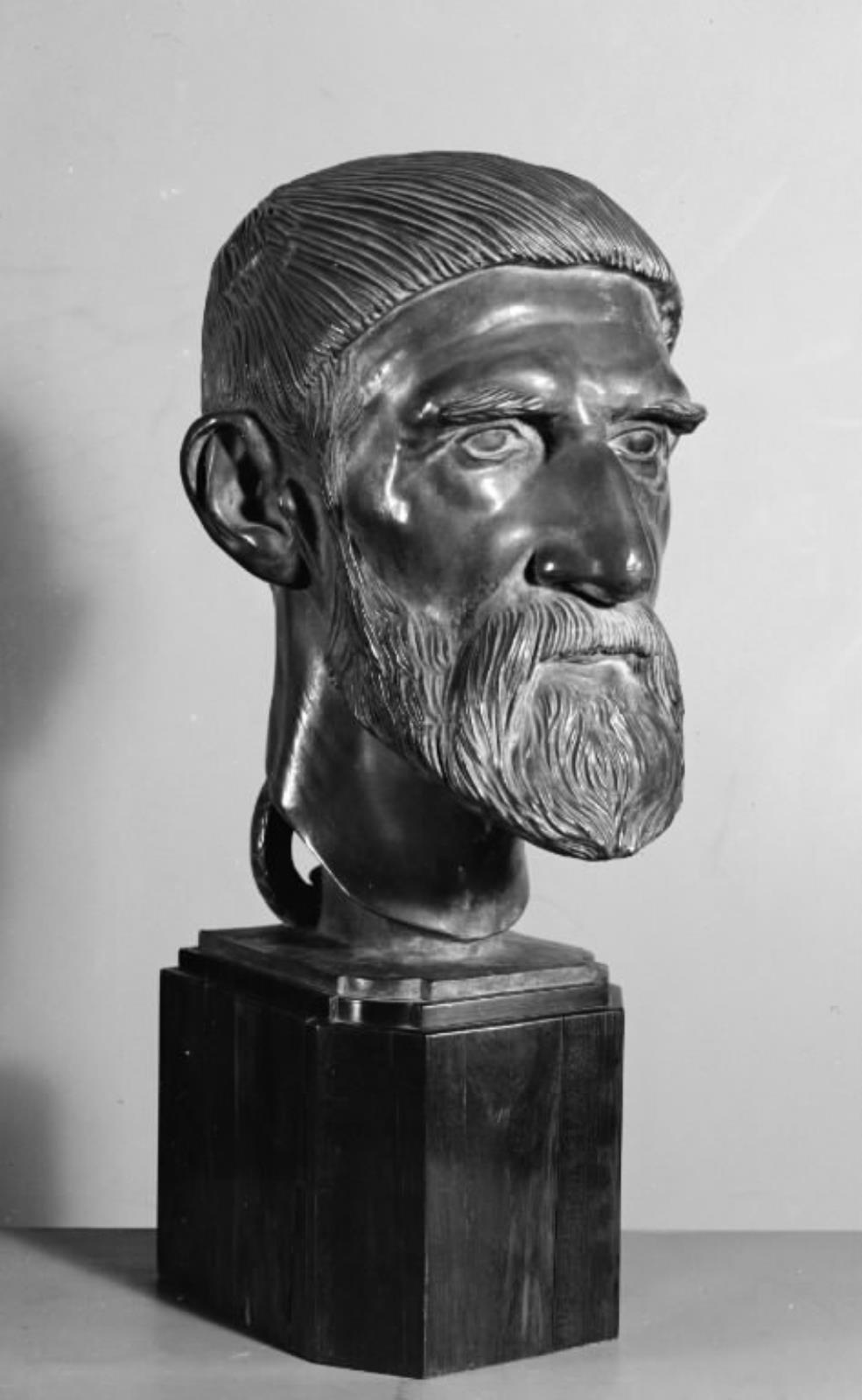
Niels Skovgaard, Danish National Gallery, Copenhagen.

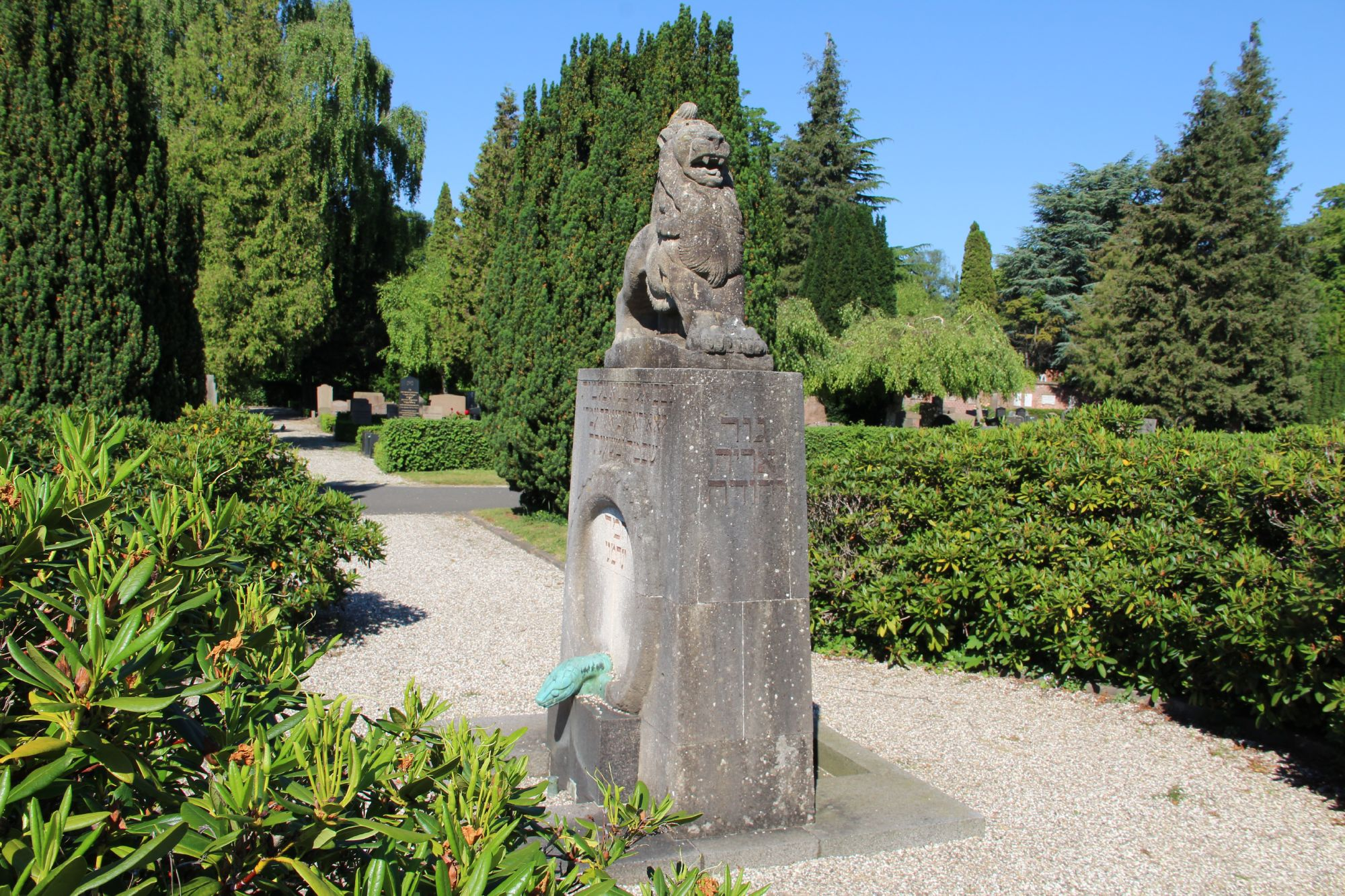
Wagner's Lion of Judah at the Jewish Western Cemetery in Copenhagen.

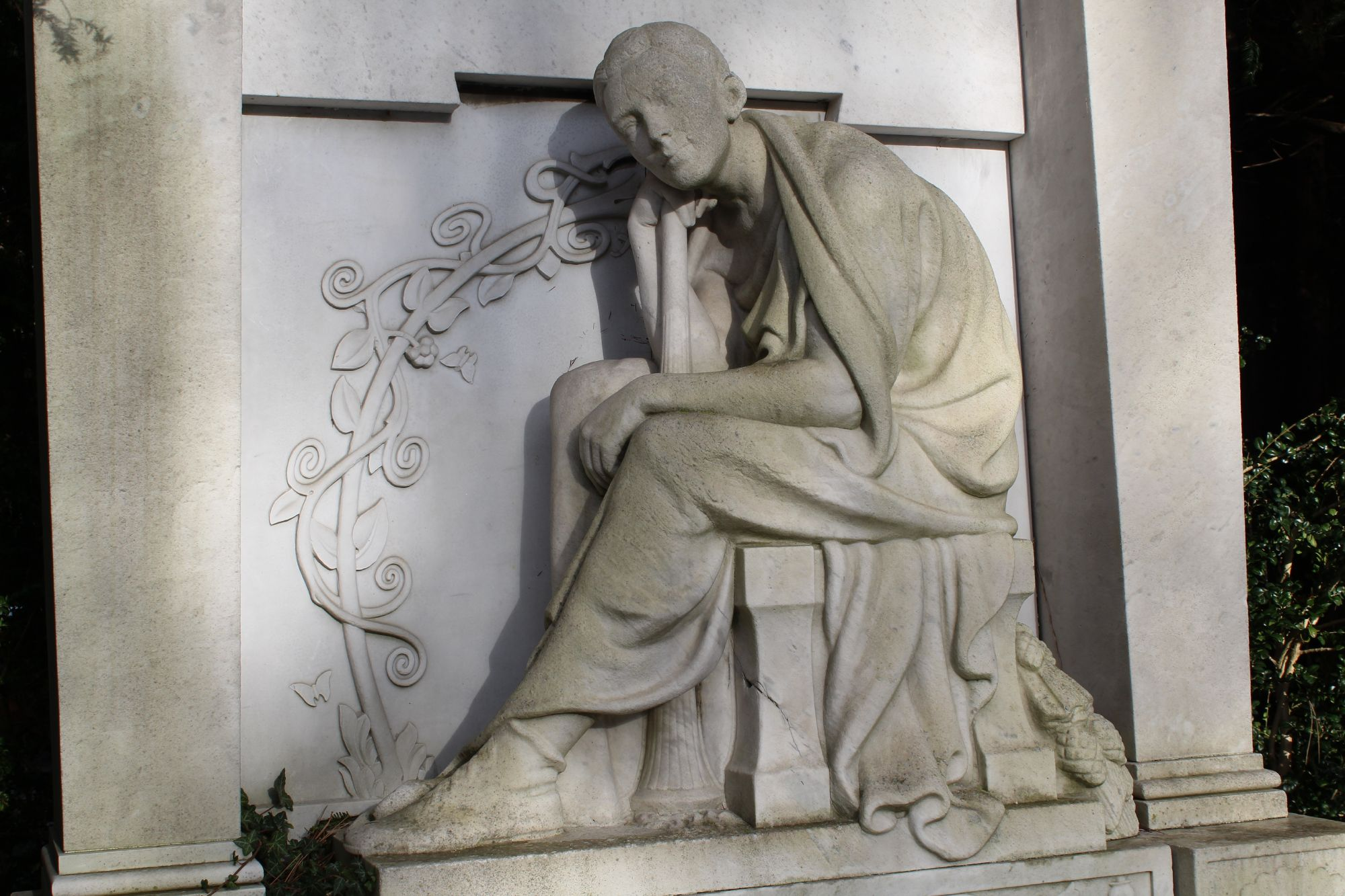
Tombstone of Eskil Eugen Aristides Hansenm Western Cemetery, Copenhagen.

=== Public art, monuments and memorials ===
- Aalborgmanden, Administrationsbygningen, Boulevarden, Aalborg (1912)
- Lur Blowers, Regnbuepladsen, Copenhagen (1914)
- Svane og Frø, Frisvadvej, Varde(1938)
- Tyge Brahe (1914, opst. 1932 ved Rundetårn)
- Bust of C. Bloch, Rigshospitalet's Garden, Copenhagen (1924, erected 1950)
- Ane Ryholt, Trelde Næs, Fredericia Municipality (1930. erected c. 1970)

=== Decorative works ===
- Baptismal font, Hellerup Church, Hellerup
- Baptismal font, Mariendal Church, Frederiksberg
- * Two bronze caryatids, Hafnia Building, Holmens Kanal9, Copenhagen (1910–11)
- Lion of Judag, Mosaisk vestre Begravelsesplads, Copenhagen (limestone, 1929)
- Ravnegruppe, Rigshospitalet, Copenhagen (1931)
- Reliefs at Mønsteds Plads, Copenhagen (portal, plaster model 1909)
- 3 allegorical reliefs, Rockefeller Institute, Juliane Mariesvej 28, Copenhagen (models 1927);
- Reliefs, Institute of Chemistry and Physics, Blegdamsvej 19 and 21, Copenhagen (sandstone models, 1930)
- 4 reliefs, Psychiatric Clinic, Rigshospitalet, Copenhagen (artificial stone, 1933)
- Granite reliefs, Aalborg Court House, Aalborg
- Granite reliefs, Hobro Court House, Hobro
- Nykøbing M, Mors (bremerstenrelieffer)
- Relief on fireplace, Vesterbro 18, Aalborg.
- Memorial to Edvard Nielsen (1906, Trunderup)
- Memorial to Fr. Klee (1907, Silkeborg Bad)
- Monument to Elise Halkier, Tårbæk Cemetery, Tårbæk (1910)
- Monument to Chr. Henrichsen, Assistens Cemetery, Horsens (1917)
- Memorial to five fallen Resistance Fighters, Års (1947, with Ejnar Packness)
- Monument to Danish Jew who died in Theresienstadt (granite, 1946, Mosaisk vestre Begr.pl.,);
- Spme 2++ gravestone, including those of J.E. Otto, )Garrison Cemetery8; Viggo Stuckenberg (Assistens Cemetery, Copenhagen), Frederikke Heine (Mosaisk Vestre Begr.pl., Copenhagen), M.R. Raffel (smst.), dir. Jacob Lachmann (smst.), Valdemar Holm (Vestre Kgrd., Copenhagen), Christian N. Therchilsen (Frederiksberg Old Cemetery), Carl Bernhard Philipsen (Jewish Western Cemetery, Copenhagen)

=== Other ===
- orfulgt (1894)
- Livets brønd (1904)
- Stær (bronze, 1904, Kunstindustrimus., with Olga Wagner)
- Støtten fra Sodoma (1905, Vejen Kunstmuseum, later in limestone)
- Frøprinsen (porfyr, 1909)
- Frejr på galten (limestone, 1914–24, with Olga Wagner, Danish National Gallery)
- David med den overvundne Goliaths hoved (bronze, 1923)
- Kineser med fisk (model for statue in Tivoli, bronze, 1923)

' Angorakanin (Greenlandic marble, 1942)

- En træt vandringsmand (plaster, 1948)

Statuettes

- Borger fra Potu (bronze, 1905)
- En gammel kone og Kone med krans (stoneware, 1905, bronze in the Ny Carlsberg Glyptotek)
- I sandhed jeg trykkes hårdt af de lidelser som ere mig beskikkede (1908)

Portrait busts

- Monumentalt kvindehoved, hustruen (1900)
- Viggo Stuckenberg (1901, Frederiksborg Museum)
- En ung jødinde (1905)
- Kai Hoffmann (1915)
- Niels Skovgaard (1923, Danish Design Museum)
- Georg Høeberg (1925, Frederiksborg Museum and Teatermuseet)
- P.V. Jensen-Klint (1928)
- Henri Nathansen (1931, Det kgl. Teater and Teatermuseet)
- L. Fridericia (1932)
- Johannes V. Jensen (1932, Danish National Gallery)
- Johan Rohde (1934)
- Jacob Texière (1939)
- J.F. Willumsen (1941)
- Lion of Judag, Mosaisk vestre Begr.plads, Copenhagen (limestone, 1929)
- Chr. Bohr, D.F. Eschricht and P.L. Panum (marble, Institute of Physiology, University of Copenhagen).
