= Morten Christoffersen =

Danish windsurfer

Personal information
- Full name: Morten Bo Egeblad Christoffersen
- Nationality: Danish
- Born: 10 February 1968 (age 57); Virum, Denmark

Sport
- Country: Denmark
- Sport: Windsurfing

Morten B. Christoffersen (born 10 February 1968) is a Danish windsurfer. He competed at the 1992 Summer Olympics and the 1996 Summer Olympics.
