= Sorgenfri Cemetery =

Cemetery in Copenhagen, Denmark

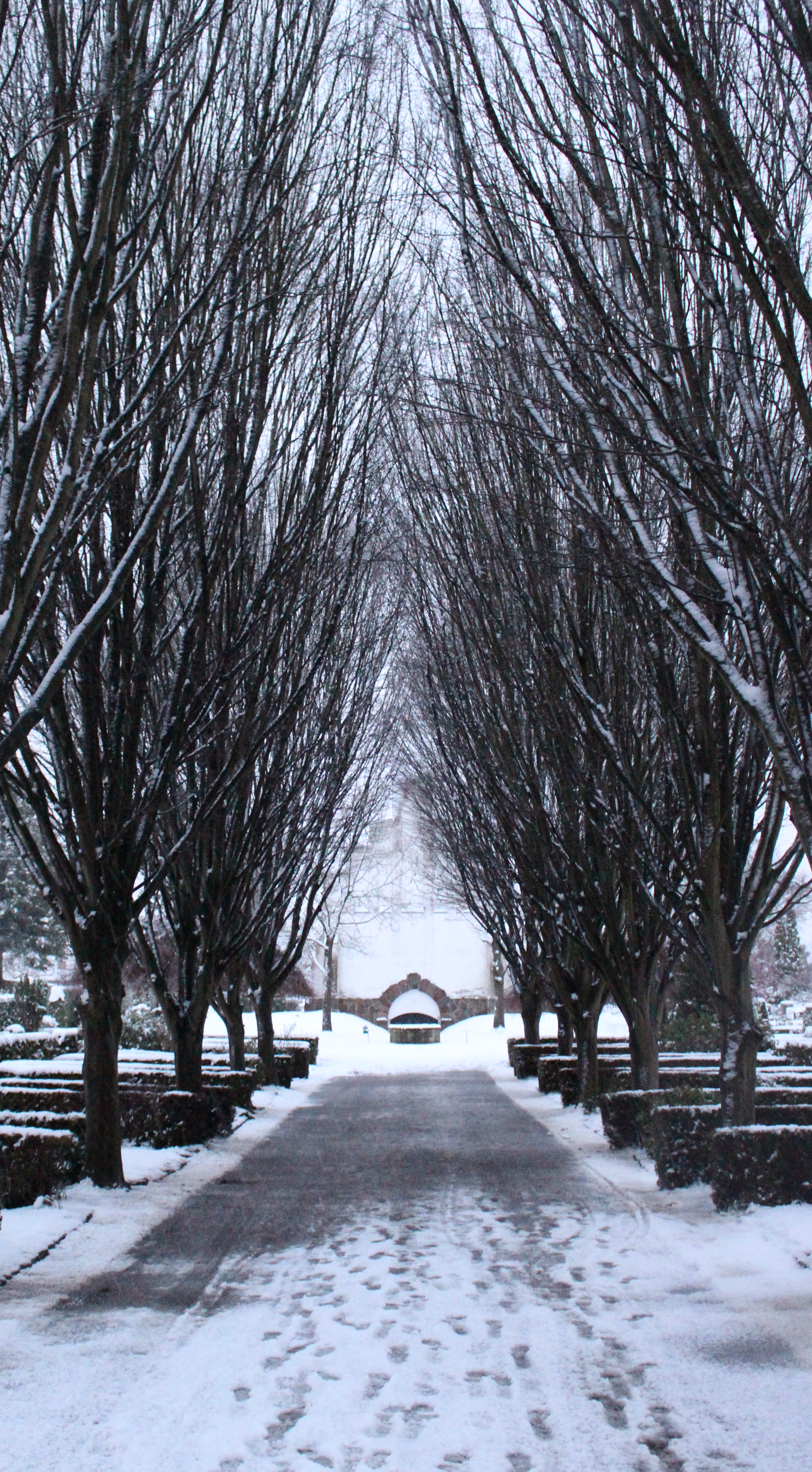
Sorgenfri Cemetery, January 2021

Sorgenfri Cemetery (Danish: Sorgenfri Kirkegård) is a municipal cemetery operated by Lyngby-Taarbæk Municipality in Sorgenfri in the northern suburbs of Copenhagen, Denmark.

== History ==
The cemetery was established in 1903. It has later been expanded several times.

== Description ==
The main entrance to the oldest section of the cemetery is located at Lottenborgvej, just west of Lottenborg Inn. Just inside the cemetery is a chapel from 1905. In front of the chapel is a statue of a mourning woman. It was created by the sculptor Olga Wagner. Together with her husband, the sculptor Siegfried Wagnerm she lived in a house across the street from the cemetery entrance.

== List ==
Interment	Lived	Profession	Ref
Arthur Arnholtz	1901–1973	writer,linguist	Ref
Jørgen Bo	1919–1999	Architect	Ref
Sven Sophus Elskær	1926–1984	Furniture designer	Ref
Kaj Engholm	1906–1988	Illustrator	Ref
Hans Fuglsang-Damgaard	1890–1979	Bishop	Ref
Mogens Glistrup	1926–2008	Politician	Ref
Olaf Hagerup	1889–1961	Botanist	Ref
Niels Helweg-Larsen	1911–2008	Publisher and writer	Ref
Svend Høhsbro	1911–1998	Architect	Ref
Aksel Jørgensen	1883–1957	Painter	Ref
Erik Kofoed-Hansen	1897–1965	Fencer	Ref
Claus Kähler	1918–2002	Businessman, civil engineer and writer	Ref
Aage Lippert	1894–1969	Illustrator	Ref
Aage Lundvald	1908–1983	Illustrator, cartoonist and composer	Ref
Ivar Nørgaard	1922–2011	Politician	Ref
Kirsten Passer	1930–2012	Actress	Ref
Mikael Pasternak	1895–1967	Illustrator and painter	Ref
Erik Piper	1745–1827	Politician	Ref
Carl Schepler	1870–1942	Merchant and founder of the Irma	Ref
Erik Seidenfaden	1881–1958	archaeologist and naval officer	Ref
Keld Sengeløv	1953–2006	Director-General of DSB	Ref
Niels Verner Skak-Nielsen	1922–2013	Economist and National Statistician	Ref
Niels Skovgaard	1858–1938	Painter and sculptor	Ref
Bi Skaarup	1952–2014	Archeologist and food historian	Ref
Thorkil Vesth	1952–2014	Pianist and composer	Ref
Olga Wagner	1873–1963	Sculptor	Ref
Sigfried Wagner	1874–1954	Sculptor	Ref
