= Lur Blowers =

Coordinates: 55°40′34″N 12°34′13″E

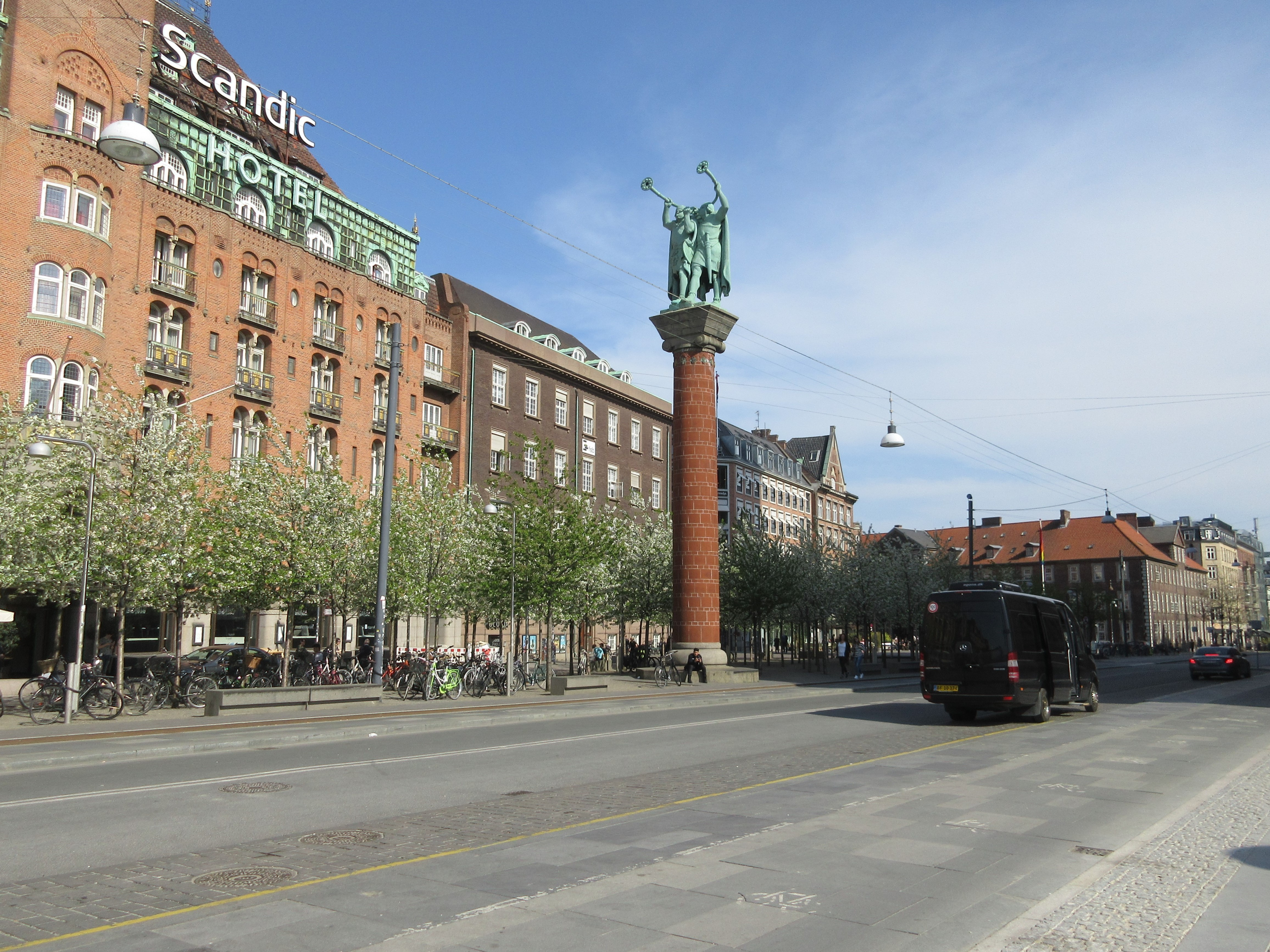
The two lur blowers

The Lur Blowers (Danish: Lurblæserne) is a monument located next to City Hall in Copenhagen, Denmark, consisting of a bronze sculpture of two lur players mounted on top of a tall terracotta column. The monument was a gift to the City of Copenhagen from the Carlsberg Foundation and New Carlsberg Foundation on the occasion of the centenary of the birth of Carlsberg founder J. C. Jacobsen.

== Design ==
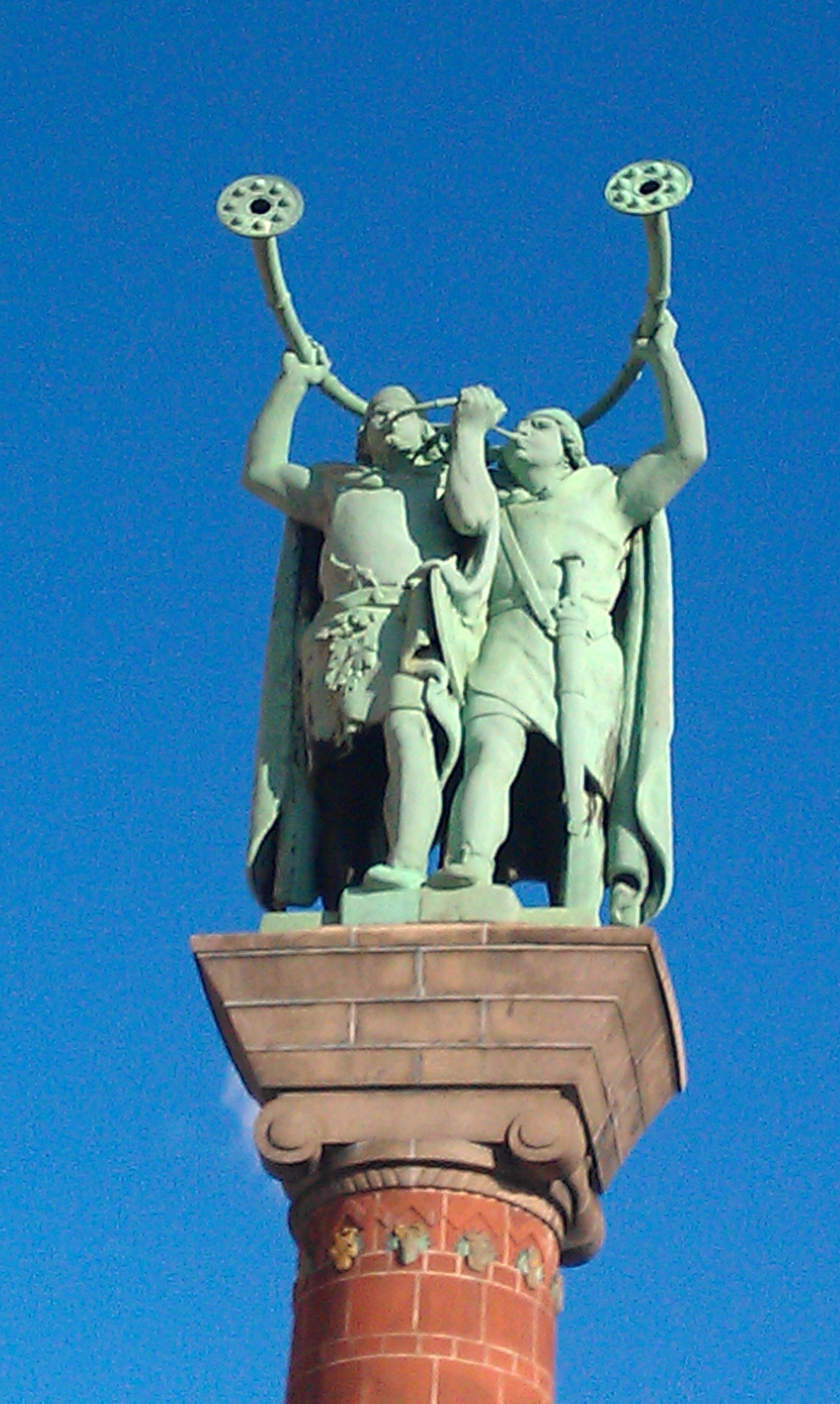
The two lur blowers

The monument stands 20 metres (66 ft) tall. The sculpture at the top of the column consists of two male figures standing very close together, wearing capes and helmets, each holding a raised lur. The compactness of the composition is a result of a design change late in the process, since the original design featured only a single lur blower. The decision to change the design was based on the fact that lurs are always tuned in pairs. The two lurs are inverted, as is seen with the Brudevælte Lurs.

The column is made of red brick and bears the inscription "J.C. JACOBSEN•CARLSBERG 1811•2•SEPTEMBER•1911". It incorporates a circular bench at its foot. The two columns of St. Mark and St. Thomas on the Piazzetta di San Marco were a source of inspiration.

== History ==
=== Nyrop's 1901 mock-up ===
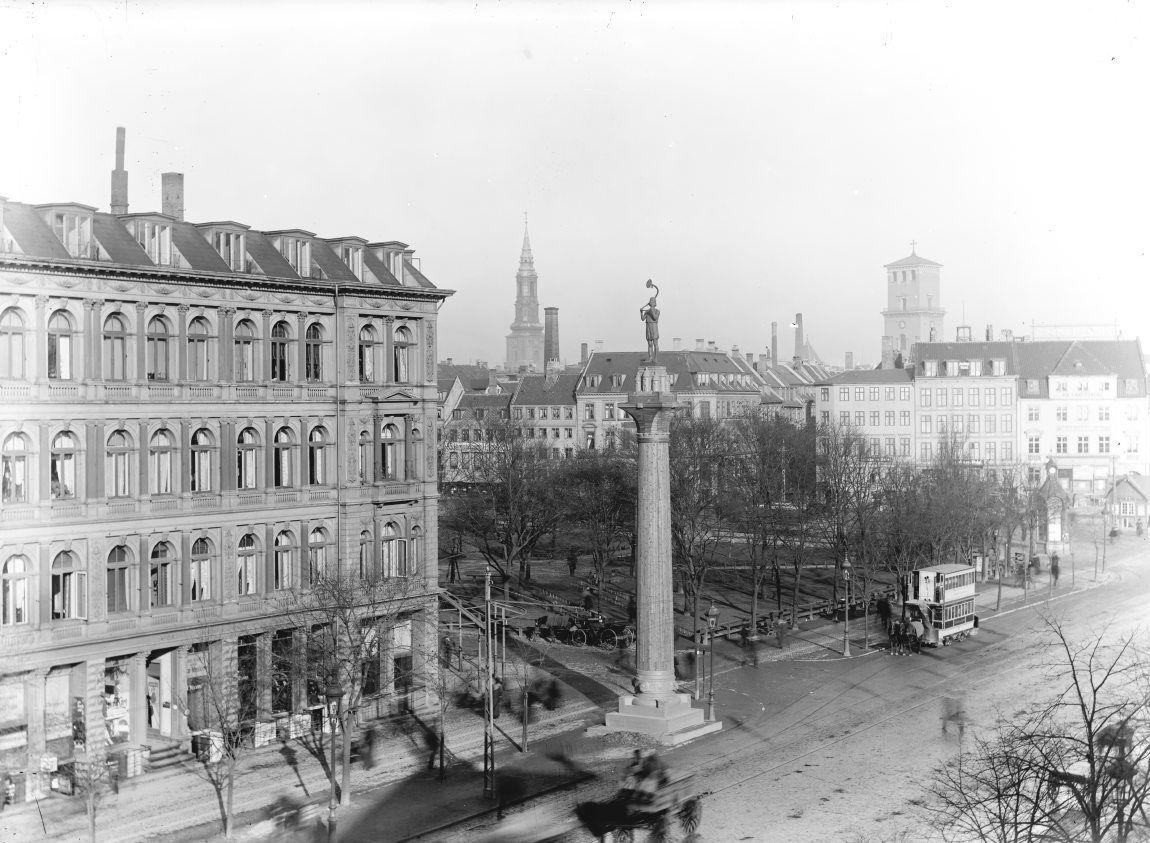
The 1901 mock-up

A monument featuring a lur blower on the new City Hall Square was first proposed by Lorenz Frølich in circa 1890. Martin Nyrop, who had designed the new Copenhagen City Hall, adopted the idea and originally envisioned two columns flanking the entrance to the City Hall Square from Vesterbrogade, each topped by a Heimdallr figure with a gjallarhorn.

A mock-up of one column was installed in front of the Central Hotel in 1901. It consisted of a wooden column designed by Nyrop and a plaster model of the Heimdallr figure designed by Anders Bundgaard. The idea was later abandoned.

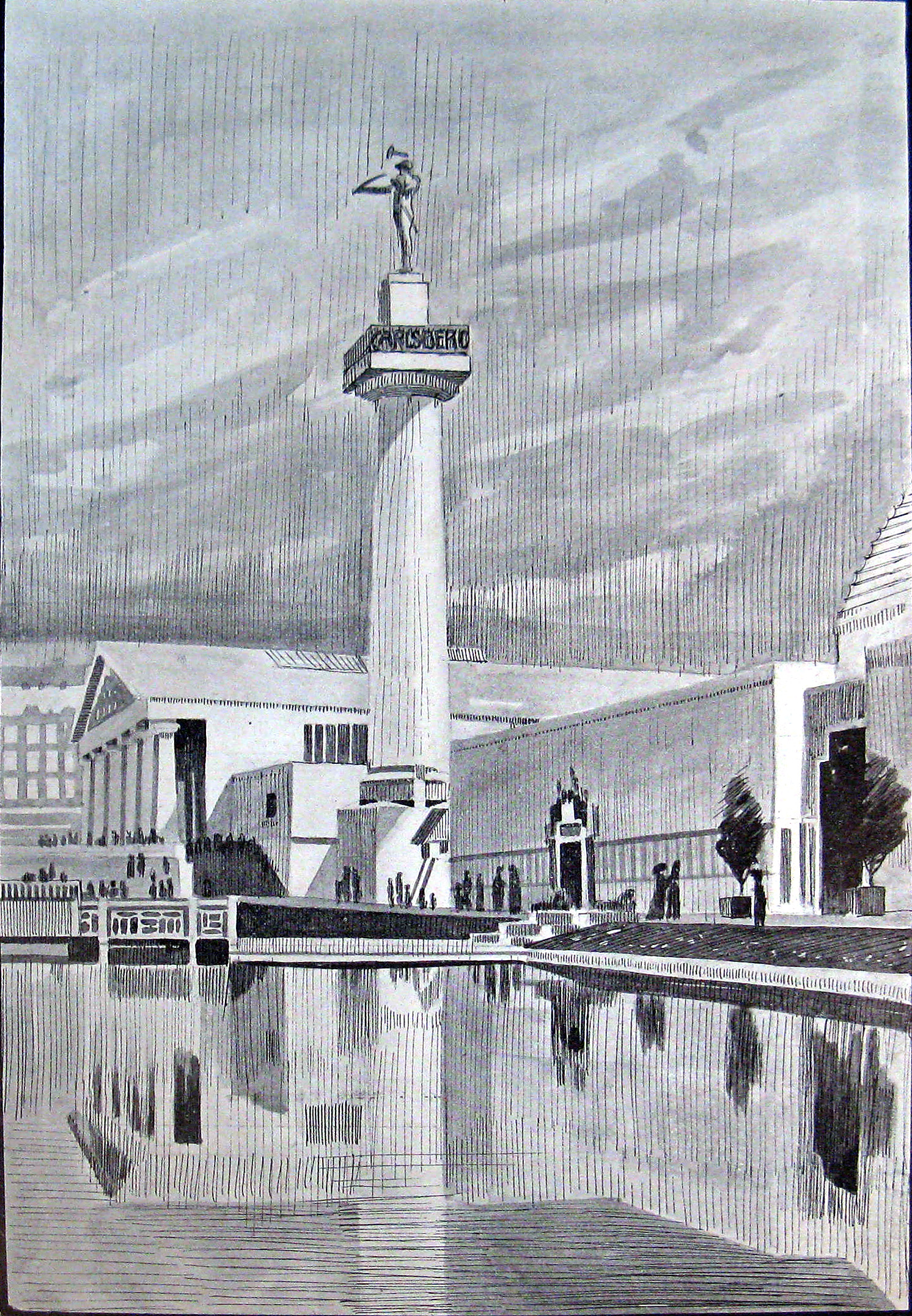
Carlsberg's victory column seen in an illustration from Illustreret Tidende

=== Carlsberg's 1909 victory column in Aarhus ===
At the 1909 Danish National Exhibition in Aarhus, Carlsberg was represented both with a display in the Industry Hall and a victory column. The latter revived the idea of a column carrying a sculpture of a lur blower. The victory column was designed by Anton Rosen, the leading architect of the exhibition, who also designed a triumphal arch for Tuborg on an adjacent site. Both structures were built in white-painted wood. They were demolished after the exhibition.

=== Final monument ===
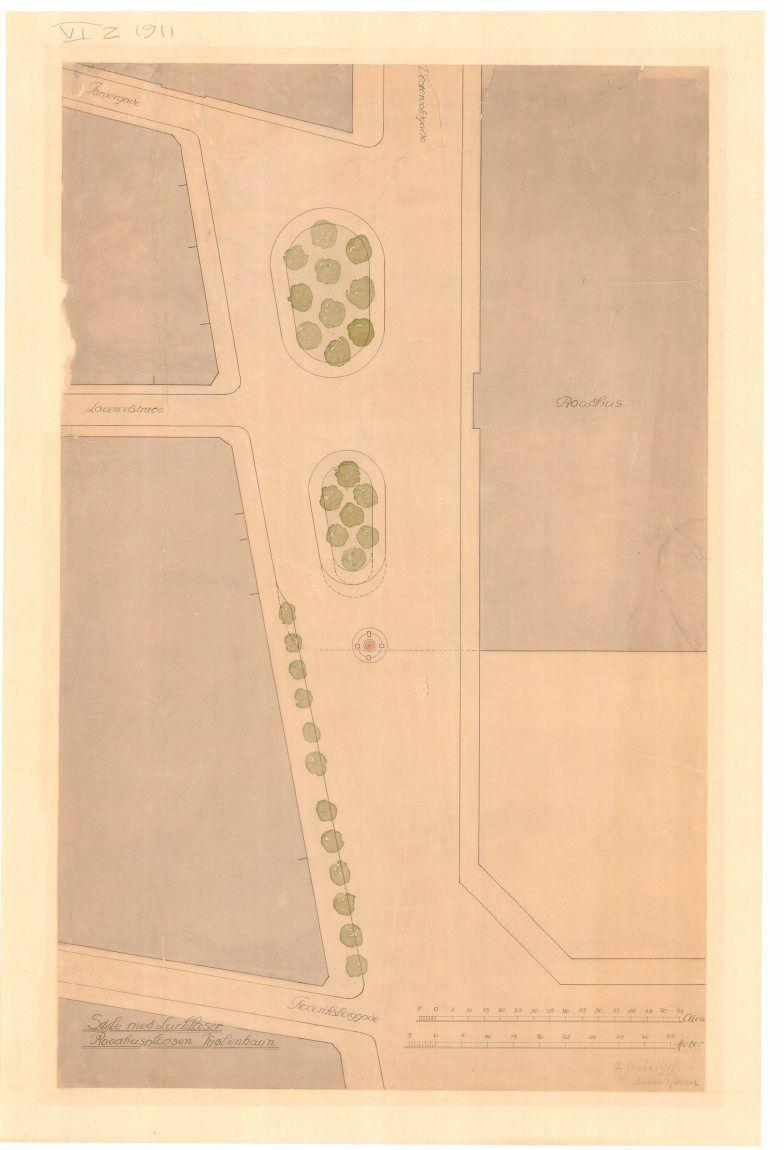
Rosen's 1911 plan for placement of the column

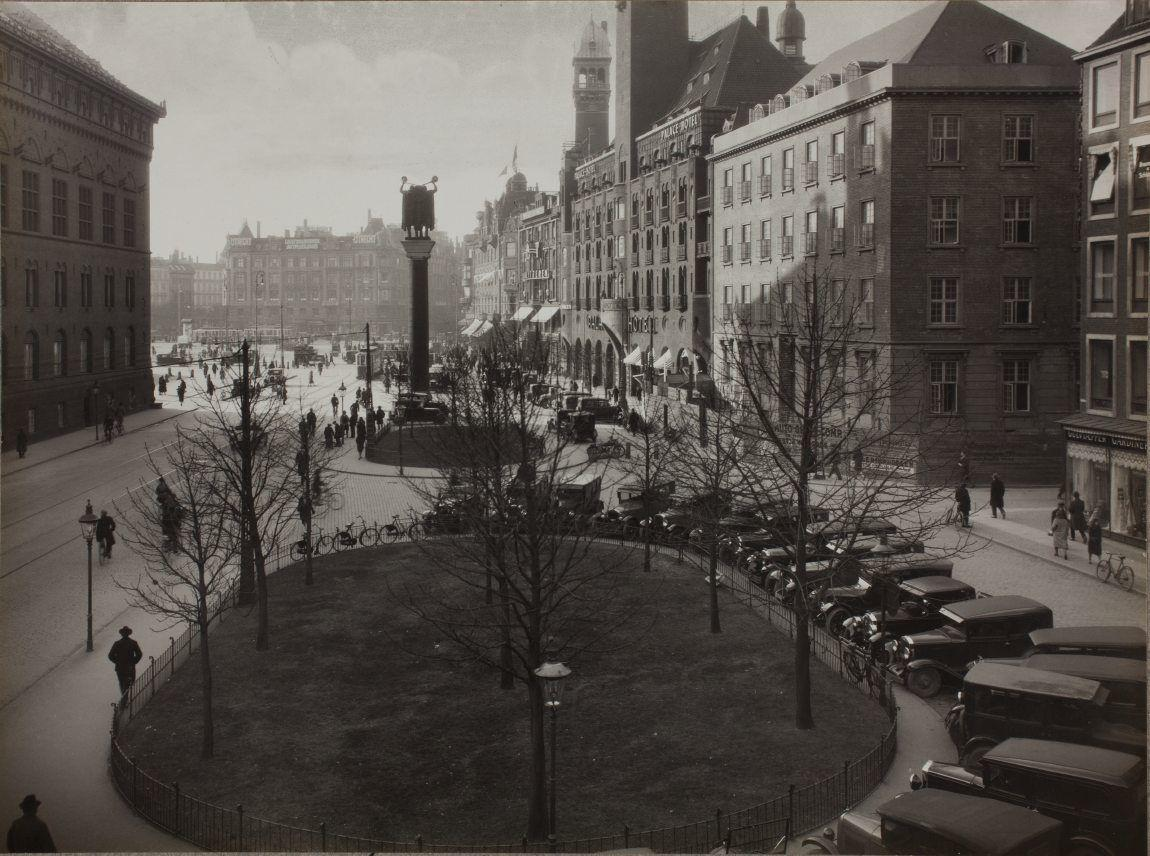
The final Lurblæserne monument photographed by Peter Elfelt in 1930

The Carlsberg Foundation and New Carlsberg Foundation later decided to donate a permanent lur-blower monument to the City of Copenhagen to mark the centenary of the birth of J. C. Jacobsen on 2 September 1911. The project was moved to the small plaza next to the City Hall. Rosen designed the column, and the sculptor Siegfried Wagner was charged with the design of the sculpture group. The monument was inaugurated in 1914.

== Cultural references ==
- In the 1968 Danish comedy film Min søsters børn vælter byen (English title: Magic in Town), Pusle (Pusle Helmuth) uses her suddenly acquired magical powers to make the two lur blowers (Bendt Reiner and Preben Basse) come alive in what eventually turns out to be a dream.
