= Virum railway station =

Railway station in Lyngby-Taarbæk Municipality, Denmark

Virum
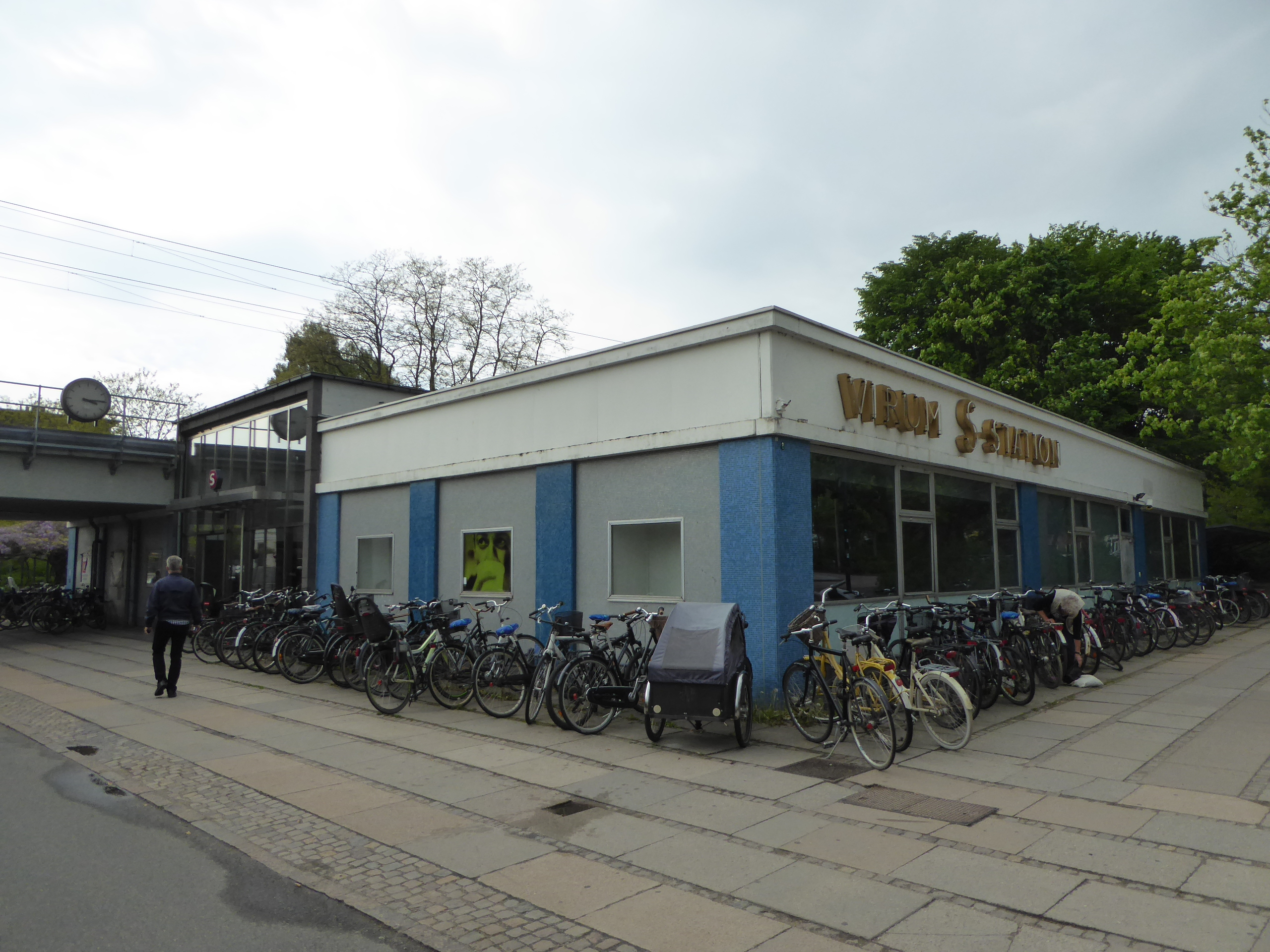
- Virum Station in 2016

General information
- Location: Frederiksdalsvej 64-66; 2830 Virum; Lyngby-Taarbæk Municipality; Denmark
- Coordinates: 55°47′46″N 12°28′23″E
- Elevation: 27.4 metres (90 ft)
- Owner: DSB (station infrastructure); Banedanmark (rail infrastructure)
- Line: North Line
- Platforms: 2 side platforms
- Tracks: 2
- Train operators: DSB

Services
Preceding station	S-train	Following station
Holte Terminus	E Mon–Fri	Sorgenfri towards Køge
Holte towards Hillerød	A Sat–Sun	Sorgenfri towards Køge
Location

Virum station is a railway station serving the suburban neighbourhood of Virum north of Kongens Lyngby north of Copenhagen, Denmark. It is located on the Hillerød radial of Copenhagen's S-train network. The station is served by E trains.

== See also ==
- List of Copenhagen S-train stations
- List of railway stations in Denmark
