= Olga Wagner =

Danish painter and sculptor (1873–1963)

Olga Rosalie Aloisa Wagner née Packness (1873–1963) was a Danish painter and sculptor. After specializing in painting at the Royal Danish Academy of Fine Arts, she was trained as a sculptor by her husband Siegfried. She worked together with him throughout her life, developing her own style. She is remembered for her large stone and bronze figures but also created smaller works in porcelain while working with Bing & Grøndahl and the Royal Danish Porcelain Factory.

== Biography ==
Born in Lyngby on 24 May 1873, Olga Rosalie Aloisa Packness was the daughter of the merchant Carl Henrik Laurits Liisberg Packness (1843–1882) and Marie Amalie Martin (1849–1909). She studied painting under Viggo Johansen in the women's section of the Royal Danish Academy, graduating in 1898. The following year, she married her fellow student, the sculptor Siegfried Wagner (1874–1952). This brought her into a lifelong artistic association focused on sculpture. Given her natural talent, she rapidly advanced in the art under her husband's guidance. As a result of Siegfried's employment at Bing & Grøndahl under Jens Ferdinand Willumsen, they were both influenced by his distinctive style. The couple's ideals stemmed from the international youth movement, Olga Wagner reflecting her mother's homeland, Austria.

Wagner first exhibited in 1901 at the Charlottenborg Spring Exhibition but thereafter presented her works at Den Frie Udstilling. Under the influence of evolving trends from abroad, she used a variety of materials including stone, wood and bronze to produce larger works in relation to architecture and nature. She also created ceramics for Royal Copenhagen and Bing & Grøndahl. Her larger works included the marble Barnefigur (Figure of a Child, 1911) and the limestone Frejr på Galten (1924).

Her sculpture Naturen, der bærer handelen was installed in Klosterpassagen in Copenhagen in 1922. A bronze cast of her sculpture Tankefuld kvinde was erected inside the main entrance to Sorgenfri Cemetery in 1945. Also notable is her plaster model from 1936 for a bronze statue representing the zoologist Peter Wilhelm Lund. Owing to lack of funding the statue was never completed but the model is now on display at Copenhagen's Zoological Museum.

In 2006, Vejen Art Museum exhibited works by Olga and Siegfried Wagner, including sculptures, furniture, ceramics, silver and artefacts in wood.

Olga Wagner died in Lyngby on 24 May 1963. She is buried in Sorgenfri Cemetery.
