= John Helt =

Danish footballer (born 1959)

Personal information
- Date of birth: 29 December 1959 (age 66)
- Place of birth: Virum, Denmark
- Position: Midfielder

Senior career*
Years	Team	Apps	(Gls)
1980–1984	Lyngby BK	135	(6)
1984–1986	Brøndby IF	37	(0)
1986–1987	FC Sochaux-Montbéliard	18	(0)
1987–1991	Lyngby BK	119	(4)

International career^{‡}
1982–1990	Denmark	39	(0)
- * Club domestic league appearances and goals as of 6 August 2010 ‡ National team caps and goals as of 6 August 2010

John Helt (born 29 December 1959) is a Danish former football (soccer) player in the midfielder position.

== Club career ==
He made his first team debut in 1978 with Lyngby Boldklub, with whom he won the 1983 Danish championship and 1984 Danish Cup trophies. He moved to play for league rivals Brøndby IF where he won the 1985 Danish championship. Back in Lyngby, he helped the club win the 1990 Danish Cup. He ended his career at Lyngby in November 1991, having played 378 matches and scored ten goals for the club.

== International career ==
Helt played 39 matches for the Denmark national football team from 1982 to 1990, and represented Denmark at the 1988 European Championship.
