= Virum =

- Neighbourhood
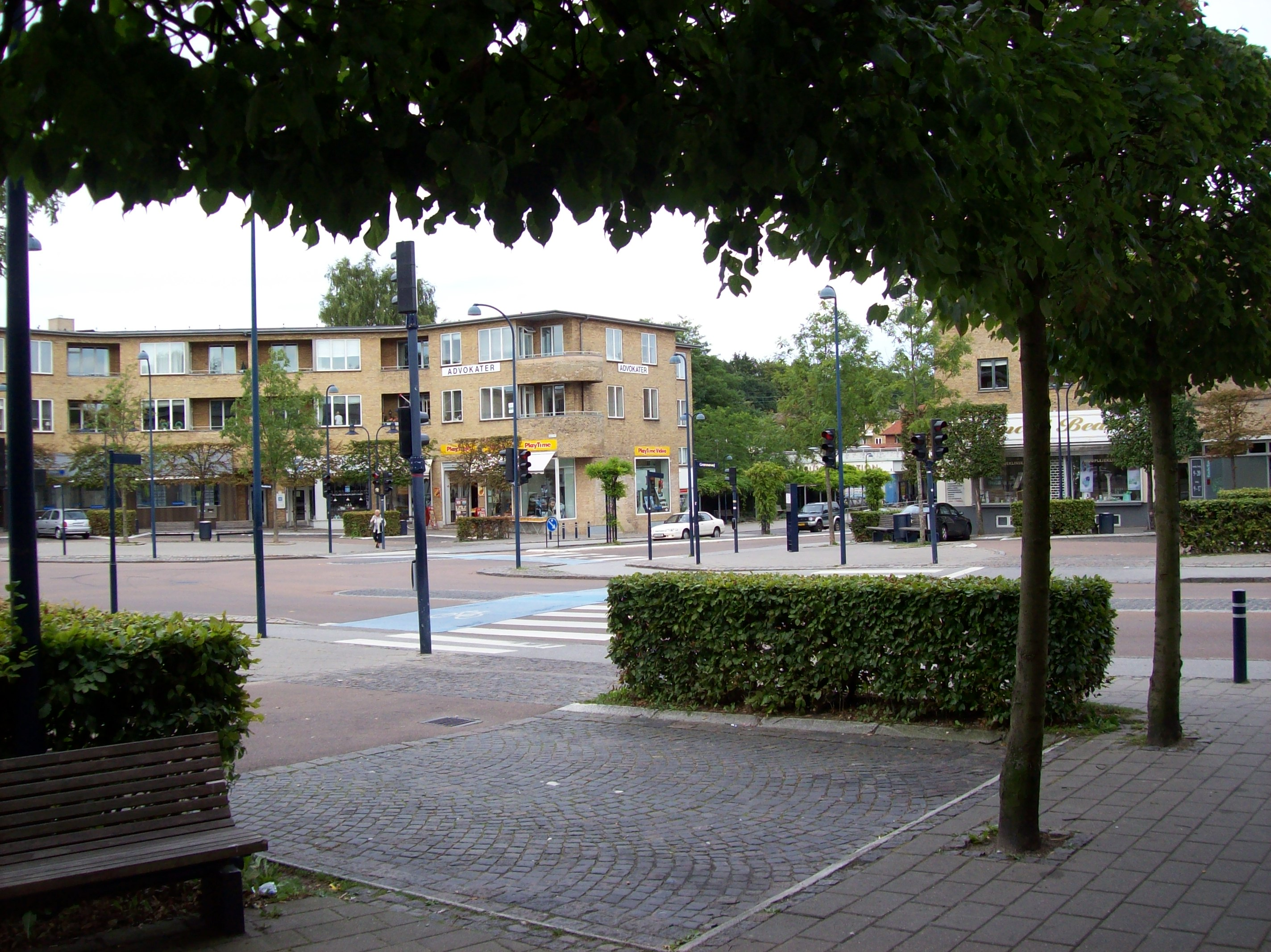
- Virum Square

- Location in the Capital Region of Denmark
- Coordinates: 55°47′30″N 12°27′35″E
- Country: Denmark
- Region: Capital Region
- Municipality: Lyngby-Taarbæk
- Time zone: UTC+1 (CET)
  - Summer (DST): UTC+2 (CEST)
- Postal code: 2830

Virum is a mostly residential, suburban neighbourhood in Lyngby-Taarbæk Municipality, located on both sides of Lyngby Kongevej, approximately 15 km north of central Copenhagen, Denmark. The neighbourhood is bordered by Lake Furesø to the west, Holte in Rudersdal Municipality to the north, Brede to the east and Kongens Lyngby and Sorgenfri to the south.

== History ==
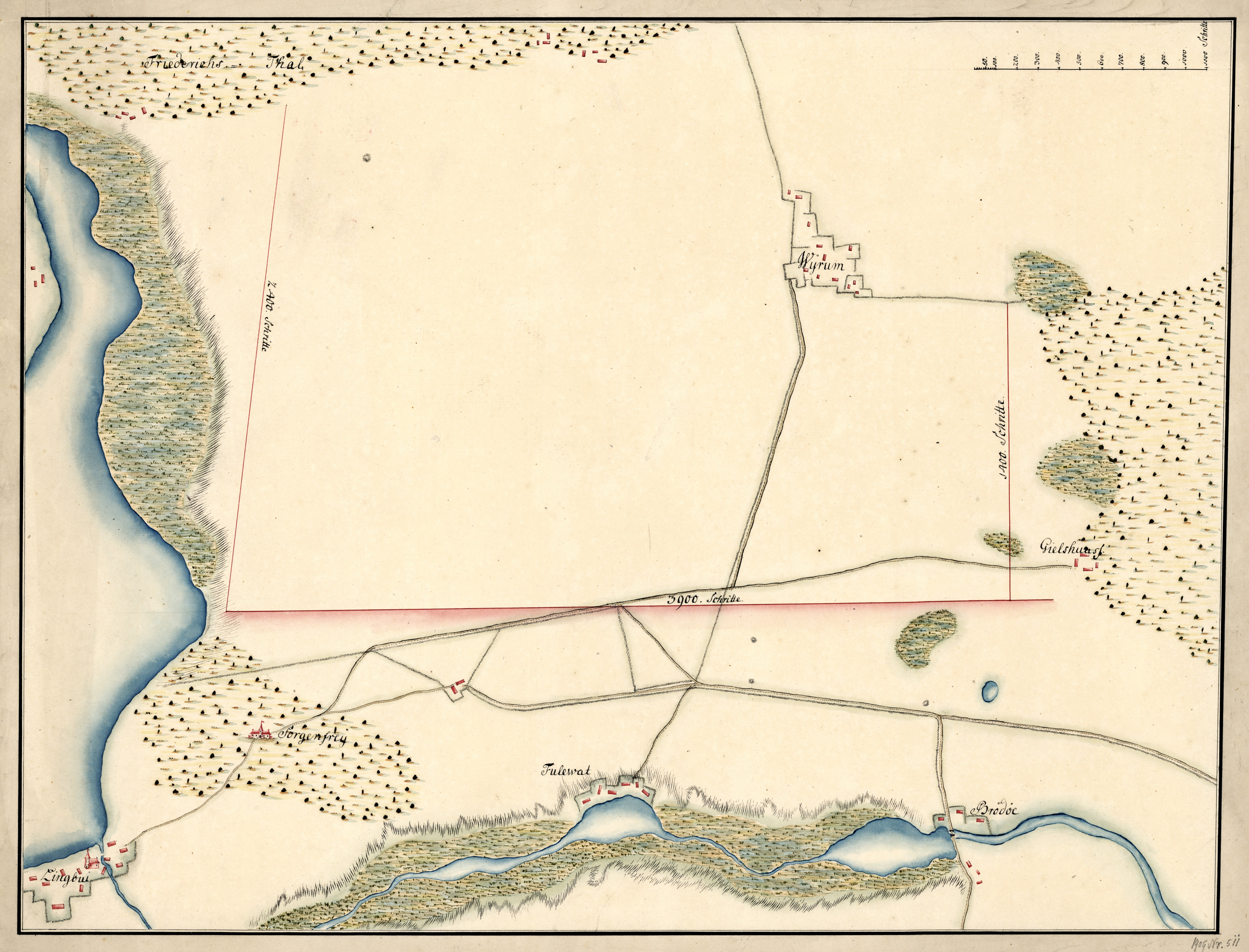
Virum (Wyrum) seen on a map from c. 1780

The village of Virum is first mentioned in a papal letter from 1186 but is no doubt considerably older. The name "an open place which is easy to defend" ( vigi: "easily defendable place" and -rum: open place). In the letter, Pope Clement III gives the Virum as well as many other villages in the area to Bishop Absalon. Absalon soon ceded the villages to the Bishopric of Roskilde.

The Bishop of Roskilde constructed the small castle Hjortholm at the site in c. 1250. The castle was destroyed during the Count's Feud in 1535. Frederick III took over the estate in 1668. He renamed it Frederiksdal and constructed a small hunting lodge at the site.

The village of Virum was located where Virumgade is today. It belonged to the parish of Lyngby. The land was divided into three areas called "Geelsvang", "Mellemvang" and "Høftevang" which were subdivided into fields and crops were rotated in accordance with the three-field system. The marchy land down towards Furesøen was grazed by livestock. In 1682, it consisted of 13 farms, three houses with land and 14 houses without land.

=== The modern suburb ===
The modern suburb was planned in connection with the conversion of the North Line into an S-train line. Virum railway station opened in 1936. The ambition was to create a healthy, well-functioning suburb with a population the size of a medium large Danish provincial town. The centre of the new suburb was Virum Torv, a mixed-use development centred on a roundabout next to the station. It contained retail space, service functions and apartments. Its northeastern corner was completed in 1939, its southeastern corner in 1943 and its southwestern corner less than a year later. A cinema, Virum Bio, was from the beginning located in the building on the southeastern corner. The same building also contained an Irma supermarket.

== Sights ==
Frederiksdal Castle is located in Virum. Its main building was built from 1744–45 and was used as a summer residence for Foreign Affairs, Privy Councilor Johan Sigismund Schulin. The Schulin Family still owns the estate.

== Sports ==
The local handball team Virum-Sorgenfri HK won the Danish Championship in 1997 and the Danish Cup in 1988.

== Transport ==
Virum railway station is located on the Hillerød radial of the S-train network and is served by Line E (Line A on weekends). Brede railway station in the eastern outskirts of Virum is served by the Lokaltog service on the Nærum Line between Jægersborg in the south and Nærum to the north.

== Notable residents ==
- Jan Popiel (born 1947), Danish-Canadian ice hockey player
- Kirsten Ortwed (born 1948), artist and sculptor
- Marianne Halfdan-Nielsen (born 1956), sailor
- Klaus Berggreen (born 1958), footballer
- John Helt (born 1959), footballer
- Stine Bosse (born 1960), businesswoman and Member of the European Parliament
- Torsten Stiig Jansen (born 1963), journalist, author, and diplomat
- Henrik Sass Larsen (born 1966), former MF and minister
- Morten Egeblad Christoffersen (born 1968), Olympic windsurfer
- Berit Christoffersen (born 1973), Olympic rower
- Jakob Piil (born 1973), bicycle racer
- Sofia Osmani (born 1979), politician and mayor
- Mikkel Beckmann (born 1983), footballer and coach
- Thomas Kristensen (born 1983), footballer and coach
- Mikkel Basse (born 1996), footballer
- Noam Yaacov (born 2004), Israeli-Danish basketball player

== Gallery ==
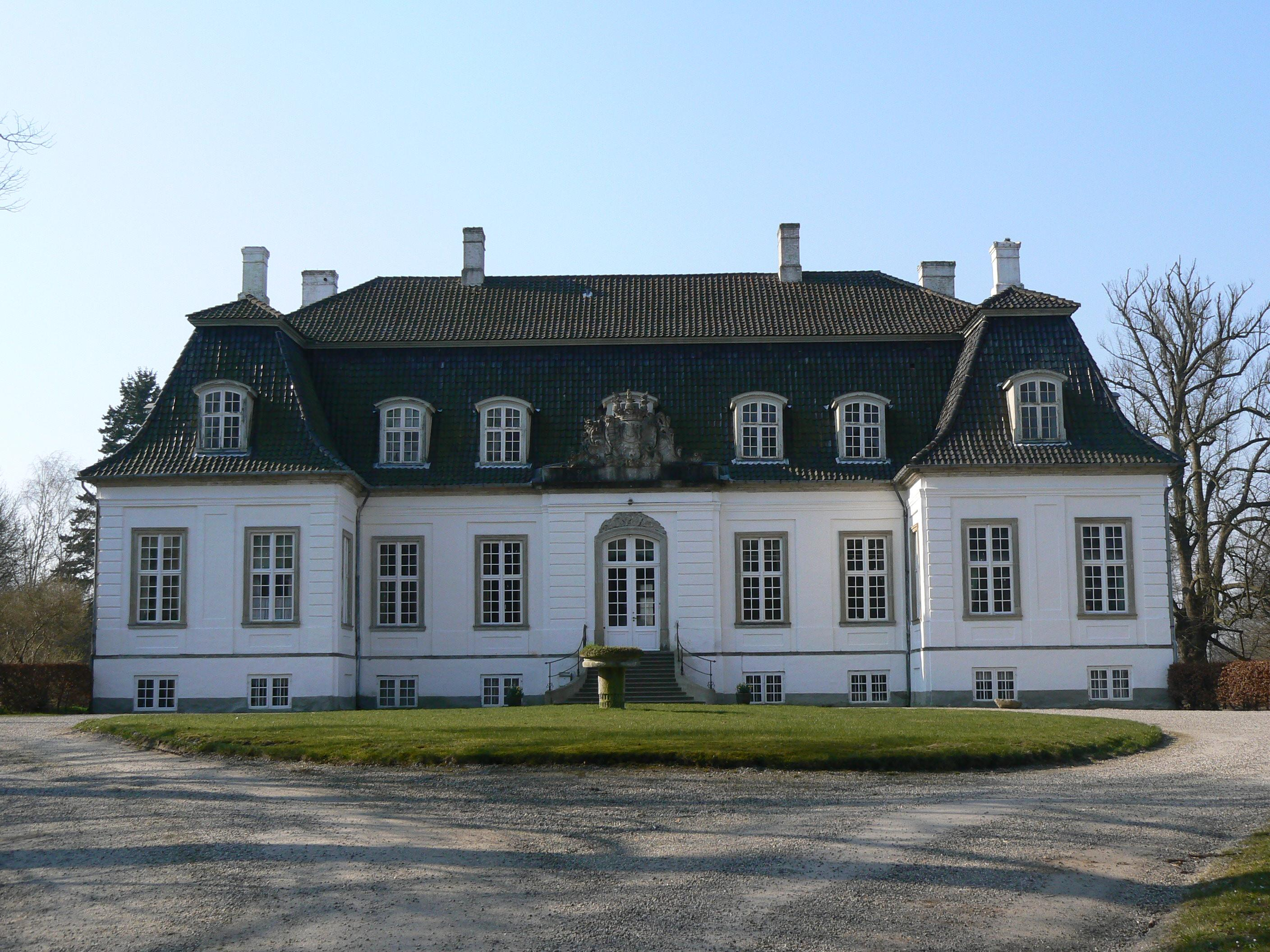
Frederiksdal Castle

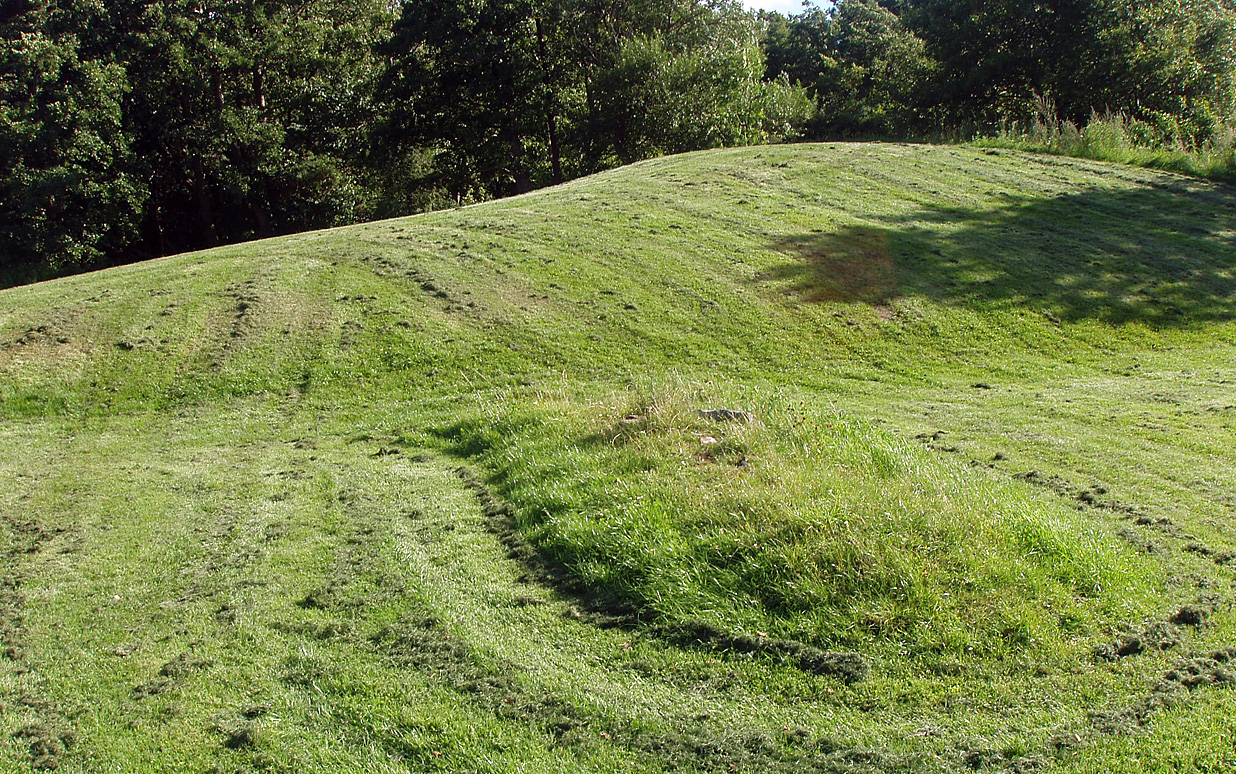
The remains of the ramparts of Hjortholm castle

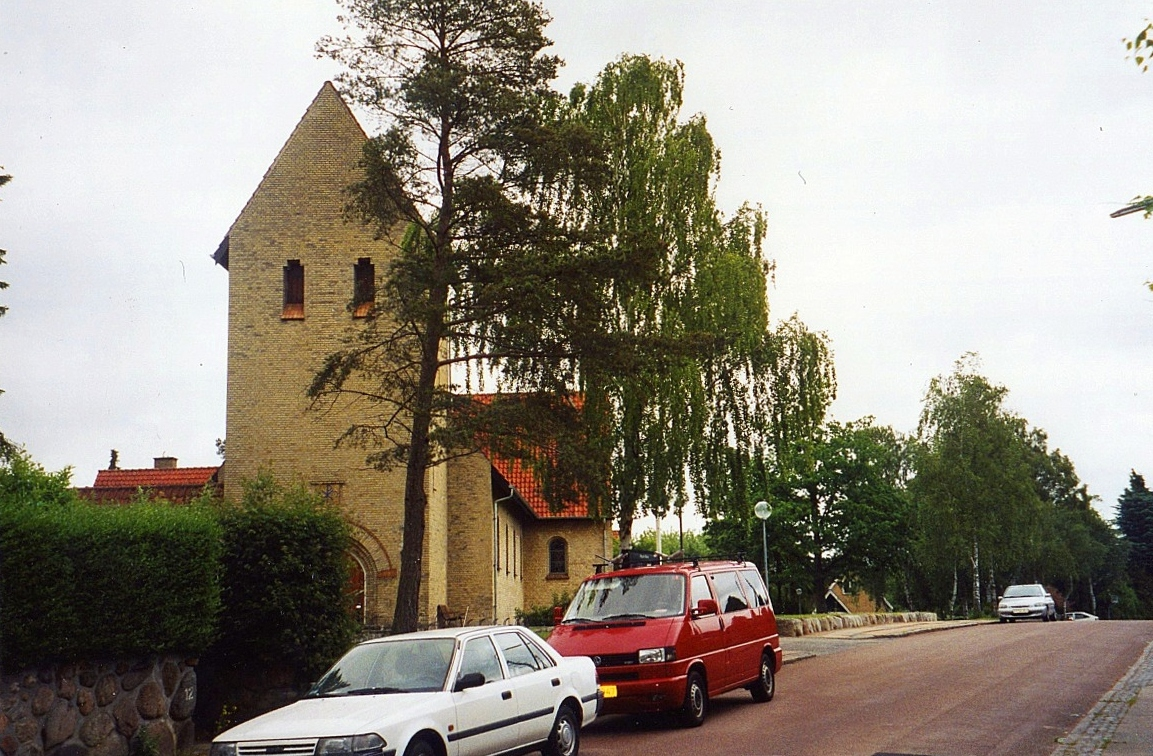
Virum church

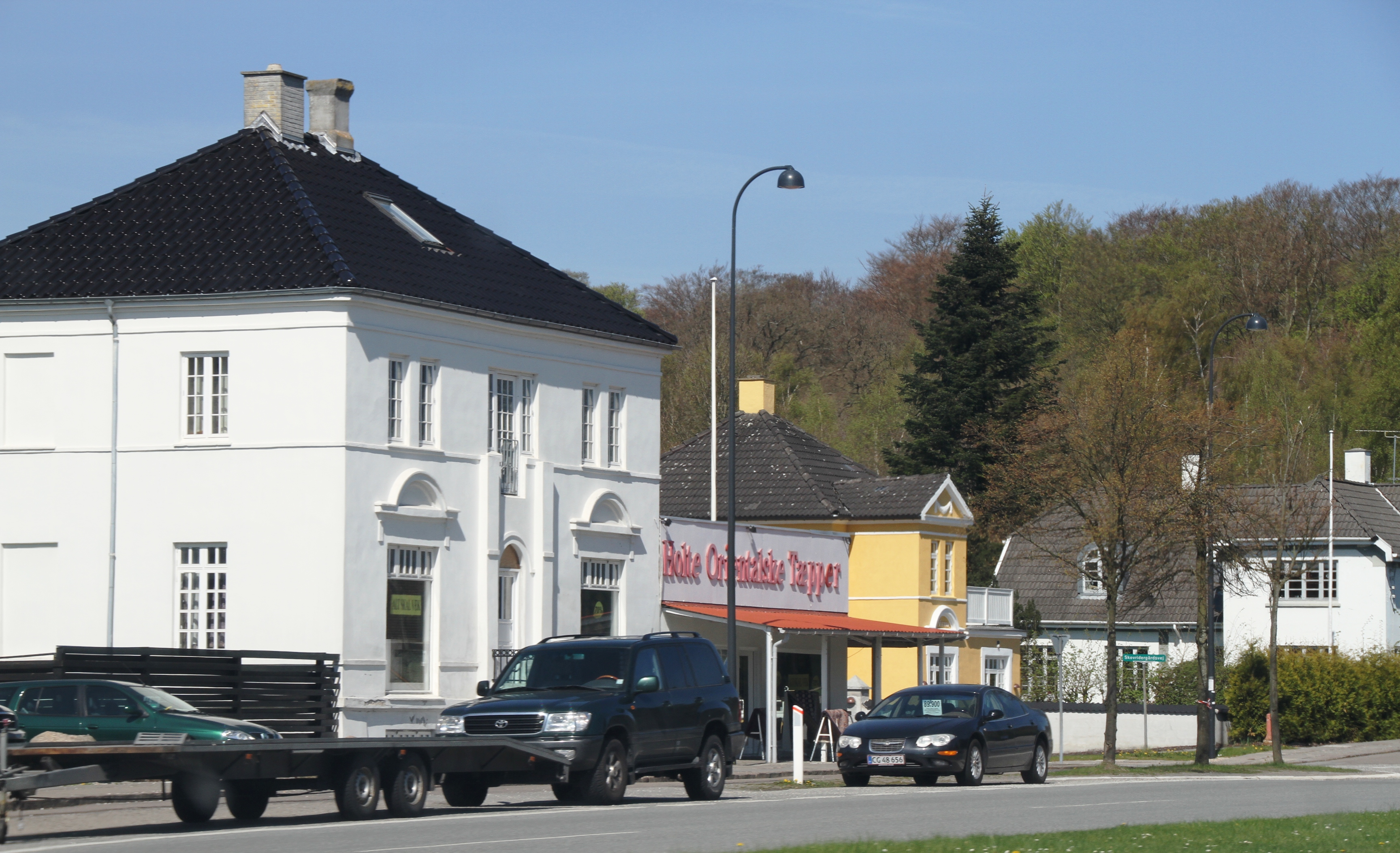
Virum village
