= Sorgenfri =

- Neighbourhood
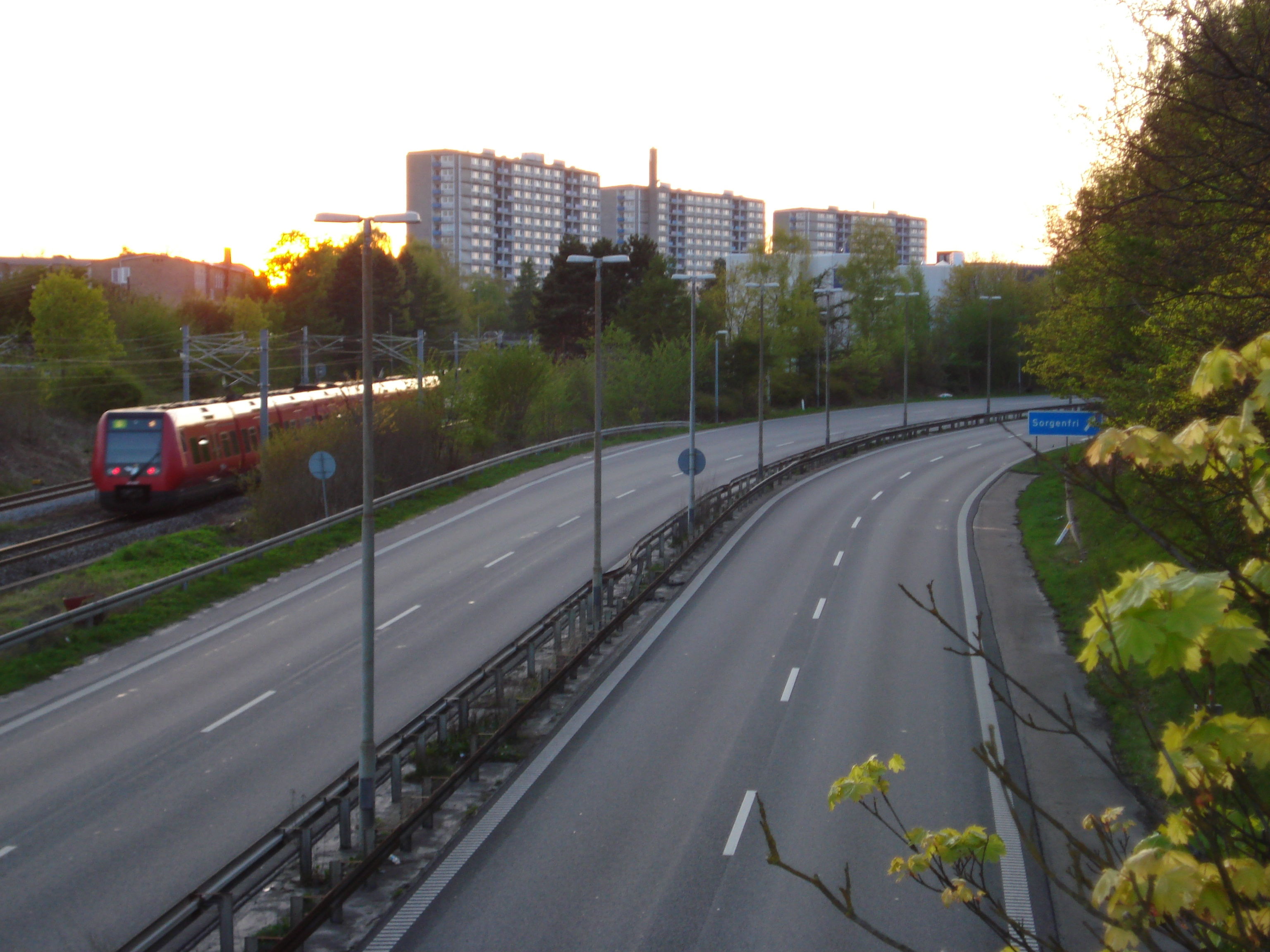
- Lyngby Bypass with view towards Sorgenfri Station

- Location in the Capital Region of Denmark
- Coordinates: 55°47′N 12°29′E
- Country: Denmark
- Region: Capital Region
- Municipality: Lyngby-Taarbæk
- Time zone: UTC+1 (CET)
  - Summer (DST): UTC+2 (CEST)

Sorgenfri (lit. "free of sorrow", like Sans Souci) is a neighbourhood in Lyngby-Taarbæk Municipality in Greater Copenhagen lying just north of Kongens Lyngby.

The neighbourhood is enclosed between the landmarks of a forest with Lyngby Åmose, Mølleådalen and Spurveskjulskoven (lit. "sparrow shelter" forest) in the south, the Furesø Lake in the west and the parklands of Sorgenfri Palace and the Open Air Museum in the east. In the north of Sorgenfri lies the town Virum – which was till the end of the First World War a village.

Lottenborg is an inn located in Sorgenfri. The building originates from the 1700s, where the town's gatekeeper (Danish: vangemanden) lived, which gave the house the nickname 'the Gatekeeper's House' (Danish: Vangehuset). The gatekeeper worked on the royal Sorgenfri Castle, and when Princess Charlotte was born in 1789 and the house was renamed to Lottenborg in her honour. Lottenborg eventually became a popular inn, and worked as inn and restaurant for many years. After the death of the owner in 1993, the house was willed to Lyngby-Taarbæk Municipality. It was put on sale in 2010 and sold in 2011.

== Notable people ==
- Frederik IX of Denmark (1899–1972), king of Denmark from 1947 to 1972
- Knud, Hereditary Prince of Denmark (1900–1976), hereditary prince and former heir presumptive
- Ingolf of Rosenborg (born 1940), count
- Lars Haagensen (born 1953), musicians and painter
- Søren Dahlgaard (born 1973), visual artist
