= Taarbæk Church =

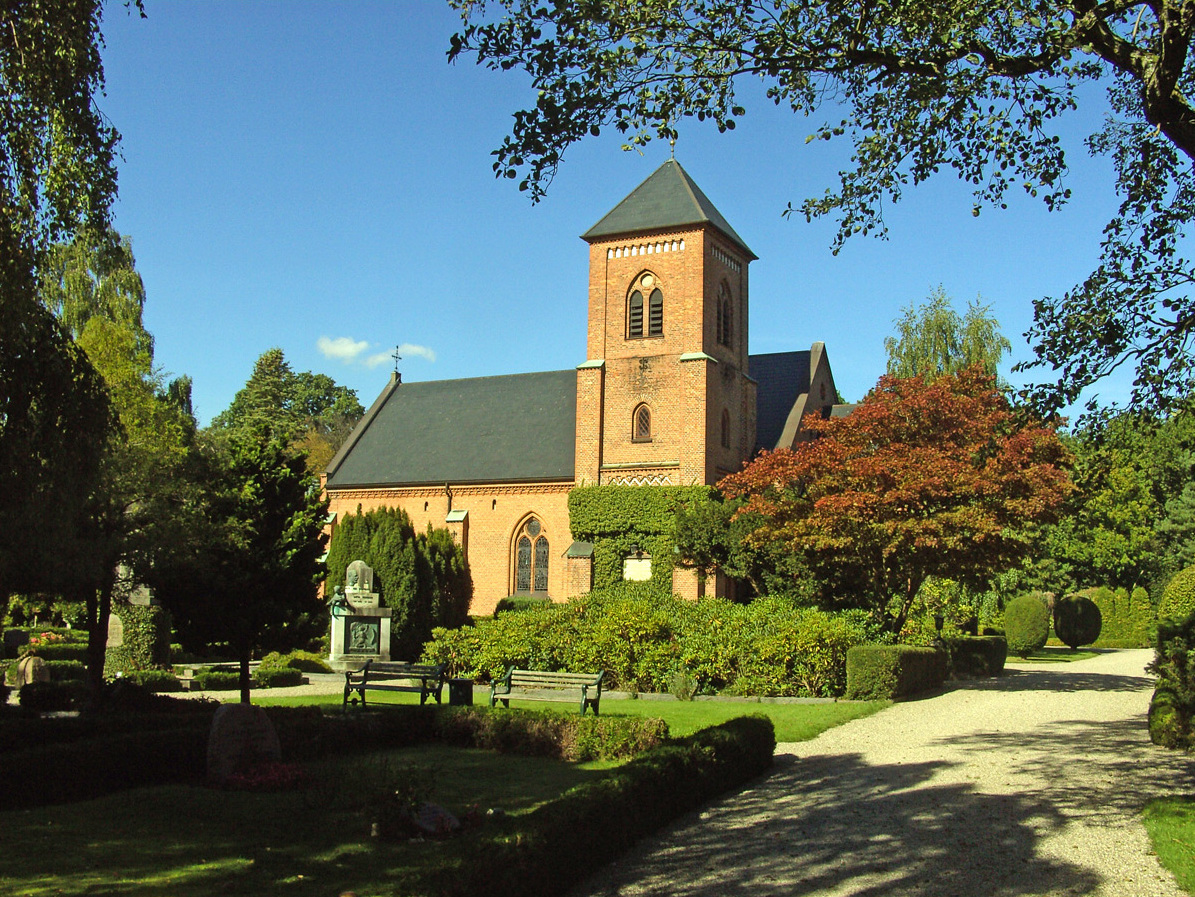
- Taarbæk Church
- 55°47′22.1″N 12°35′22.3″E
- Location: Edelslundsvej 10, 2930 Klampenborg
- Country: Denmark
- Denomination: Church of Denmark

History
- Status: Church

Architecture
- Architect: Carl Emil Wessel
- Architectural type: Church
- Completed: 1864

Specifications
- Materials: Brick

Administration
- Archdiocese: Diocese of Helsingør

Taarbæk Church (Danish: Taarbæk Kirke), formerly known as Skovkapellet, is a Church of Denmark parish church in Taarbæk, Lyngby-Taarbæk Municipality, some 15 km north of central Copenhagen, Denmark. The church and adjacent cemetery are bordered by Jægersborg Dyrehave to the north and west and by the Coast Line to the east. The church was inaugurated in 1864 but Taarbæk Paris was not disjoined from that of Lyngby until 1907.

== History ==
=== Taarbæk Prayer House ===
The fishing village of Taarbæk was originally part of Lyngby Parish. The distance to Lyngby Church was long and Jægersborg Dyrehave even made it necessary to make a detour by way of Jægersborg Allé on Sundays. In 1821, Mrs. Bilberg asked pastor Bone Falch Rønne to conduct bible readings for the community in her home. Shortly thereafter, two Englishmen, Gordon and Watt, presented their summer residence, Neptunus, to the community as a new combined school and church room. The building was from then on known as Taarbæk Skole og Bedehus (Taarbæk School and Prayer House) and colloquially as Haabet (The Hope). Rønne started Det Danske Missionsselskab in the building later the same year. Peter Rørdam succeeded as pastor of Lyngby in 1856.

=== Skovkapellet, 1764-1897 ===
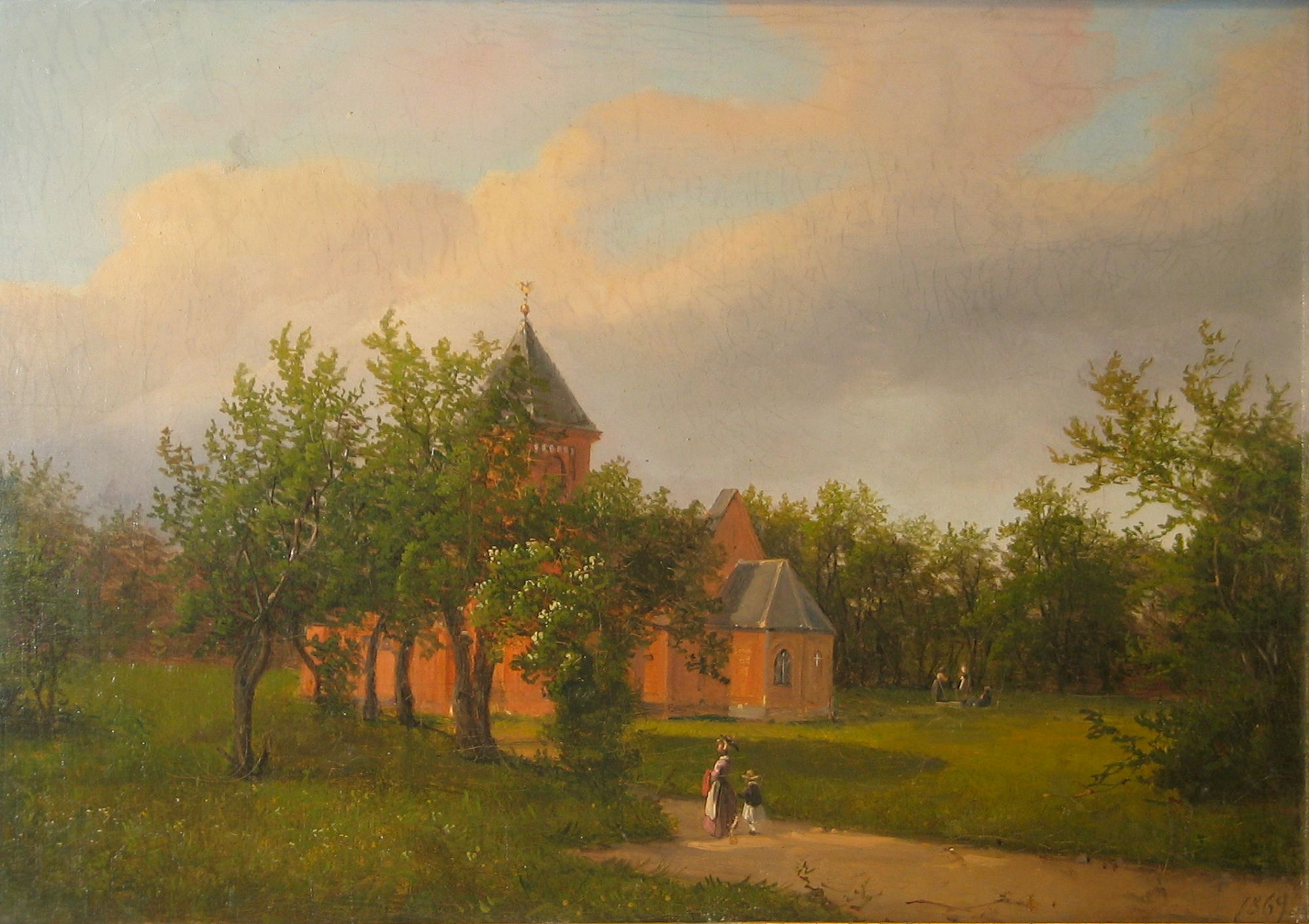
Ferdinand Richardt: View from the Church at Taarbæk, 1869

In the second half of the century, the need for a new church became more evident as the population started to grow and wealthy new citizens began to arrive. The construction of Taarbæk Church was financed through private donations with Carl Frederik Tietgen, a personal friend of the pastor at Lyngby Church, Peter Rørdam, as by far the largest contributor.

The church was inaugurated on 26 June 1864. The inaugural ceremony was conducted by Bishop Hans Lassen Martensen and attended by Christian IX. Tietgen owned a summer retreat on Taarbæk Strandvej from 1754 to 1890. Both churches therefore shared its priest. In 1880, Gerhard Kemp was employed by Lyngby Parish as chaplain with special responsibility for the Taarbæk area.

=== 20th century ===
In 1907, Taarbæk was finally incorporated as an independent parish with Kæmp as its first pastor. Cathinka Hermine von Bertouch, principal of Vallø Stift, donated a house at Taarbæk Strandvej 111 to the parish as clergy house. In 1945 this property was sold and the proceeds were used for acquiring the current rectory at Edelslundsvej 2.

== Architecture ==
The church was designed by Carl Emil Wessel. The design was supposedly inspirated by a church in Limerick, Ireland. The same church was used as a source of inspiration by Wessel's son in his design of Dragør Church. The church consists of a nave, a chancel to the west and a tower placed on the south side of the nave. The walls are supported by buttresses.

The nave features four stained glass windows created by Johan Vilhelm Andersen. The apse features a stained glass window by Kræsten Iversen from 1956. The upper part depicts Christ seated on a rainbow. The lower part of the window depicts Ansgar, Absalon and Hans Tausen. The room under the tower features a stained glass window from 1955. The central part features the scenes Jesus walking on water, Christ's meeting with Zacchaeus and the Raising of Lazarus.

Two stained glass windows from 1939 by Poul and Fanny Sæby in the chancel have now been replaced by clear window panes.

== Furnishings and fittings ==
The original altarpiece featured a painting by Peter Raadsig depicting the Agony in the Garden. It was in 2006 replaced by a modern altarpiece in stainless steel by Kurt Tegtmeier. The antependium is also from 2006 and was created by Ville Clemmesen. The pulpit was designed by Wessel in connection with his design of the church. The baptismal font is from 1939 and its upper part was carved in wood by O. Clemmensen.

The current organ is a 22-step Th. Frobenius & Sønner organ from 1976. It replaced a Marcussen & Søn organ from 1929.

Three new church bells were installed in the tower in October 1971. They replaced a church bell donated to the church by Elise Wessel in 1909. The largest of the bells is—like its predecessor from 1909—inscrived with a quote from a N.F.S. Gundtvig hymn: "Jeg kalder på gammel og ung, mest dog på sjælen træt og tung, syg for den evige hvile". The two other bells feature the inscriptions "Kyrie eleison" and "Te Deum laudamus".

== Cemetery ==
A cemetery was created at the church in 1905. It was later expanded in 1925 and 1950. Notable burials include:

- Alfred Benzon (1855-1932), businessman
- Otto Benzon (1856-1927), writer
- Valdemar Psilander (1884-1917), actor
- Villy Sørensen (1929-2001), author
- Emil Vett (1843-1911), businessman
- Theodor Wessel (1842-1895), businessman
