= 2021 Lyngby-Taarbæk municipal election =

← 2017	16 November 2021	2025 →

All 21 seats to the Lyngby-Taarbæk Municipal Council 11 seats needed for a majority
- Turnout: 31,240 (70.4%) ▼2.5pp
	First party	Second party	Third party
	C	F	A
Party	Conservatives	Green Left	Social Democrats
Last election	10 seats, 36.6%	2 seats, 7.9%	4 seats, 18.7%
Seats won	11	3	2
Seat change	▲1	▲1	▼2
Popular vote	14,169	4,327	3,866
Percentage	46.0%	14.0%	12.6%
Swing	▲9.4%	▲6.1%	▼6.1%
	Fourth party	Fifth party	Sixth party
	B	V	Ø
Party	Social Liberals	Venstre	Red–Green Alliance
Last election	2 seats, 8.5%	2 seats, 11.2%	1 seat, 4.7%
Seats won	2	1	1
Seat change	0	▼1	0
Popular vote	3,159	1,613	1,574
Percentage	10.3%	5.2%	5.1%
Swing	▲1.8%	▼6.0%	▲0.4%
	Seventh party
	D
Party	New Right
Last election	0 seats, 1.8%
Seats won	1
Seat change	▲1
Popular vote	853
Percentage	2.8%
Swing	▲1.0%
Mayor before election
Sofie Osmani
Conservatives
Mayor after election
Sofie Osmani
Conservatives

Counting from 1950 and prior to this election, the Conservatives had held the mayor's position in 67 of the 71 years. Venstre had held it from 2010 to 2013, but lost it to the Conservatives following the 2013 election.

In the 2017 election, the Conservatives had won 10 seats, just one short of an absolute majority. However, they found an agreement with the Social Democrats, and Sofie Osmani could continue for her 2nd term.

In this election, they would however win an absolute majority, and Sofie Osmani was set to win a third term.

== Electoral system ==
For elections to Danish municipalities, a number varying from 9 to 31 are chosen to be elected to the municipal council. The seats are then allocated using the D'Hondt method and a closed list proportional representation. Lyngby-Taarbæk Municipality had 21 seats in 2021

Unlike in Danish General Elections, in elections to municipal councils, electoral alliances are allowed.

== Electoral alliances ==
=== Electoral Alliance 1 ===
Party		Political alignment
B	Social Liberals	Centre to Centre-left
E	Lokallisten Vores kommune - LTK	Local politics
F	Green Left	Centre-left to Left-wing
G	Vegan Party	Single-issue
Ø	Red–Green Alliance	Left-wing to Far-Left

=== Electoral Alliance 2 ===
Party		Political alignment
D	New Right	Right-wing to Far-right
I	Liberal Alliance	Centre-right to Right-wing

=== Electoral Alliance 3 ===
Party		Political alignment
C	Conservatives	Centre-right
O	Danish People's Party	Right-wing to Far-right
Q	Bydelenes Stemmer	Local politics
V	Venstre	Centre-right

== Results by polling station ==
E = Lokalisten Vores kommune - LTK
Q = Bydelenes Stemmer

Division	A	B	C	D	E	F	G	I	O	Q	V	Ø
Division	%	%	%	%	%	%	%	%	%	%	%	%
Lyngby Midt	12.0	9.8	45.3	3.2	0.9	12.9	0.4	2.4	1.6	0.6	5.9	5.0
Lindegård	21.4	9.8	35.6	3.9	0.7	13.5	0.4	1.6	2.2	0.4	3.7	6.7
Trongård	11.6	10.7	48.0	2.6	0.5	11.4	0.5	2.5	0.9	0.3	5.1	5.9
Engelsborg	12.1	9.5	49.0	2.7	0.3	11.9	0.2	2.2	1.2	0.7	5.6	4.5
Fuglsanggård	13.3	8.1	43.7	3.0	0.4	16.8	0.5	1.8	1.4	0.3	5.7	5.2
Hummeltofte	11.3	10.9	48.5	2.1	0.3	15.2	0.4	1.4	0.7	0.0	4.9	4.3
Virum	7.3	10.6	52.1	2.4	0.4	13.5	0.3	2.0	0.6	0.2	6.8	3.8
Taarbæk	6.3	13.8	58.2	1.8	0.1	9.3	0.0	1.1	0.4	0.0	3.3	5.8
Kongevej	12.4	14.7	40.0	1.9	0.2	19.8	0.2	0.9	0.7	0.1	4.8	4.3
Lundtofte	15.2	9.0	43.2	3.3	0.4	16.3	0.3	1.1	0.7	0.2	4.4	6.0

== Results ==
Party		Votes	%	+/-	Seats	+/-
Lyngby-Taarbæk Municipality
C	Conservatives	14,169	46.01	+9.38	11	+1
F	Green Left	4,327	14.05	+6.17	3	+1
A	Social Democrats	3,866	12.55	-6.18	2	-2
B	Social Liberals	3,159	10.26	+1.73	2	0
V	Venstre	1,613	5.24	-5.93	1	-1
Ø	Red-Green Alliance	1,574	5.11	+0.44	1	0
D	New Right	853	2.77	+1.02	1	+1
I	Liberal Alliance	555	1.80	-1.17	0	0
O	Danish People's Party	335	1.09	-2.38	0	0
E	Lokallisten Vores kommune - LTK	139	0.45	New	0	New
G	Vegan Party	105	0.34	New	0	New
Q	Bydelenes Stemmer	102	0.33	-0.31	0	0
Total		30,797	100	N/A	21	N/A
Invalid votes		89	0.20	+0.09		
Blank votes		354	0.80	-0.14		
Turnout		31,240	70.40	-2.48		
Source: valg.dk
