= 2025 Lyngby-Taarbæk municipal election =

Municipal election in Denmark

← 2021	18 November 2025	2029 →

All 21 seats to the Lyngby-Taarbæk municipal council 11 seats needed for a majority
- Turnout: 32,551 (72.0%) ▲1.6%
	First party	Second party	Third party
	C	F	B
Party	Conservatives	Green Left	Social Liberals
Last election	11 seats, 46.0%	3 seats, 14.1%	2 seats, 10.3%
Seats won	9	3	3
Seat change	▼2	0	▲1
Popular vote	13,592	4,275	4,011
Percentage	42.4%	13.3%	12.5%
Swing	▼3.7%	▼0.7%	▲2.2%
	Fourth party	Fifth party	Sixth party
	A	Ø	V
Party	Social Democrats	Red-Green Alliance	Venstre
Last election	2 seats, 12.6%	1 seat, 5.1%	1 seat, 5.2%
Seats won	2	1	1
Seat change	0	0	0
Popular vote	3,345	1,770	1,606
Percentage	10.4%	5.5%	5.0%
Swing	▼2.1%	▲0.4%	▼0.2%
	Seventh party	Eighth party
	I	O
Party	Liberal Alliance	Danish People's Party
Last election	0 seats, 1.8%	0 seats, 1.1%
Seats won	1	1
Seat change	▲1	▲1
Popular vote	1,484	1,237
Percentage	4.6%	3.9%
Swing	▲2.8%	▲2.8%
Mayor before election
Sofia Osmani
Conservatives
Mayor after election
Sofia Osmani
Conservatives

The 2025 Lyngby-Taarbæk Municipal election was held on November 18, 2025, to elect the 21 members to sit in the regional council for the Lyngby-Taarbæk Municipal council, in the period of 2026 to 2029. Sofia Osmani from the Conservatives, would secure re-election.

== Background ==
Following the 2021 election, Sofia Osmani from Conservatives became mayor for a third term. She would run for a fourth term.

== Electoral system ==
For elections to Danish municipalities, a number varying from 9 to 31 are chosen to be elected to the municipal council. The seats are then allocated using the D'Hondt method and a closed list proportional representation. Lyngby-Taarbæk Municipality had 21 seats in 2025.

== Electoral alliances ==
=== Electoral Alliance 1 ===
Party		Political alignment
A	Social Democrats	Centre-left
B	Social Liberals	Centre to Centre-left
F	Green Left	Centre-left to Left-wing
Ø	Red-Green Alliance	Left-wing to Far-Left

=== Electoral Alliance 2 ===
Party		Political alignment
C	Conservatives	Centre-right
Å	The Alternative	Centre-left to Left-wing

=== Electoral Alliance 3 ===
Party		Political alignment
I	Liberal Alliance	Centre-right to Right-wing
M	Moderates	Centre to Centre-right
O	Danish People's Party	Right-wing to Far-right
V	Venstre	Centre-right

== Results by polling station ==
Division	A	B	C	F	I	M	O	V	Z	Ø	Å
Division	%	%	%	%	%	%	%	%	%	%	%
Lyngby Midt	10.6	11.3	39.6	13.9	5.7	1.4	4.7	5.5	0.0	6.3	0.9
Lyngby Idrætsby	15.6	10.2	31.9	16.4	4.0	0.9	7.9	4.3	0.0	7.7	0.9
Trongård	9.4	12.9	42.4	12.3	6.2	1.0	3.1	3.8	0.0	6.9	1.3
Engelsborg	9.4	11.3	46.5	12.9	4.6	2.1	3.4	5.2	0.0	3.7	0.8
Taarbæk	6.0	17.6	52.2	7.8	4.1	0.5	2.0	2.5	0.0	5.6	1.6
Virum	7.0	12.7	50.5	9.2	5.5	1.1	1.9	7.7	0.0	3.5	0.8
Hummeltofte	10.1	12.9	46.8	13.4	3.2	1.1	2.7	4.3	0.0	4.8	0.7
Virumhallerne	11.6	13.7	39.2	14.7	4.2	1.7	3.7	5.1	0.0	5.1	1.0
Lundtofte	11.8	13.2	38.3	15.8	3.3	0.9	4.8	3.9	0.0	7.0	0.9

== Results ==
Party		Votes	%	+/-	Seats	+/-
Lyngby-Taarbæk Municipality
C	Conservatives	13,592	42.35	-3.65	9	-2
F	Green Left	4,275	13.32	-0.73	3	0
B	Social Liberals	4,011	12.50	+2.24	3	+1
A	Social Democrats	3,345	10.42	-2.13	2	0
Ø	Red-Green Alliance	1,770	5.52	+0.40	1	0
V	Venstre	1,606	5.00	-0.23	1	0
I	Liberal Alliance	1,484	4.62	+2.82	1	+1
O	Danish People's Party	1,237	3.85	+2.77	1	+1
M	Moderates	415	1.29	New	0	New
Å	The Alternative	303	0.94	New	0	New
Z	Saxen	54	0.17	New	0	New
Total		32,092	100	N/A	21	N/A
Invalid votes		103	0.23	+0.03		
Blank votes		356	0.79	+0.02		
Turnout		32,551	71.99	+1.59		
Source: valg.dk

== Opinion polls ==
Polling firm	Fieldwork date	Sample size	C	F	A	B	V	Ø	I	O	M	Z	Å	Others	Lead
Epinion	4 Sep - 13 Oct 2025	579	39.3	15.2	11.4	9.8	4.9	2.2	8.5	3.8	0.6	–	0.0	0.0	24.1
2024 european parliament election	9 Jun 2024		13.4	19.8	11.4	12.3	13.8	5.1	8.7	3.9	7.7	–	2.5	–	6.0
2022 general election	1 Nov 2022		10.4	10.6	19.1	7.7	12.8	4.6	10.4	2.2	13.5	–	3.9	–	5.6
2021 regional election	16 Nov 2021		35.7	9.5	16.3	13.8	8.8	6.2	2.3	1.6	–	–	0.4	–	19.4
2021 municipal election	16 Nov 2021		46.0 (11)	14.1 (3)	12.6 (2)	10.3 (2)	5.2 (1)	5.1 (1)	1.8 (0)	1.1 (0)	–	–	–	–	31.9
