= Cottageparken =

Public park in Denmark

Coordinates: 55.783°N 12.590°E

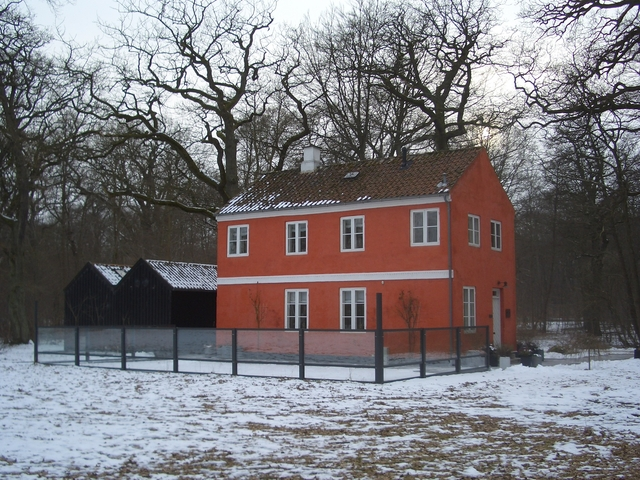
The Red Cottage

Cottageparken (literally "The Cottage Park") is a public park located on the border between Taarbæk to the north and Klampenborg to the south, adjacent to Jægersborg Dyrehave and Bellevue Beach, on the Øresund coast north of Copenhagen, Denmark. It is most notable for Den Røde Cottage (The Red Cottage) and Den Gule Cottage (The Yellow Cottage), the only surviving buildings of Klampenborg Spa which opened at the site in the 1840s. They are now operated as restaurants. Den Røde Cottage has one star in the Michelin Guide. Until 2017 its chef was Anita Klemensen. The park is located within Klampenborg postal district (2930 Klampenborg, mostly in Gentofte Municipality) but in Lyngby-Taarbæk Municipality.

== History ==
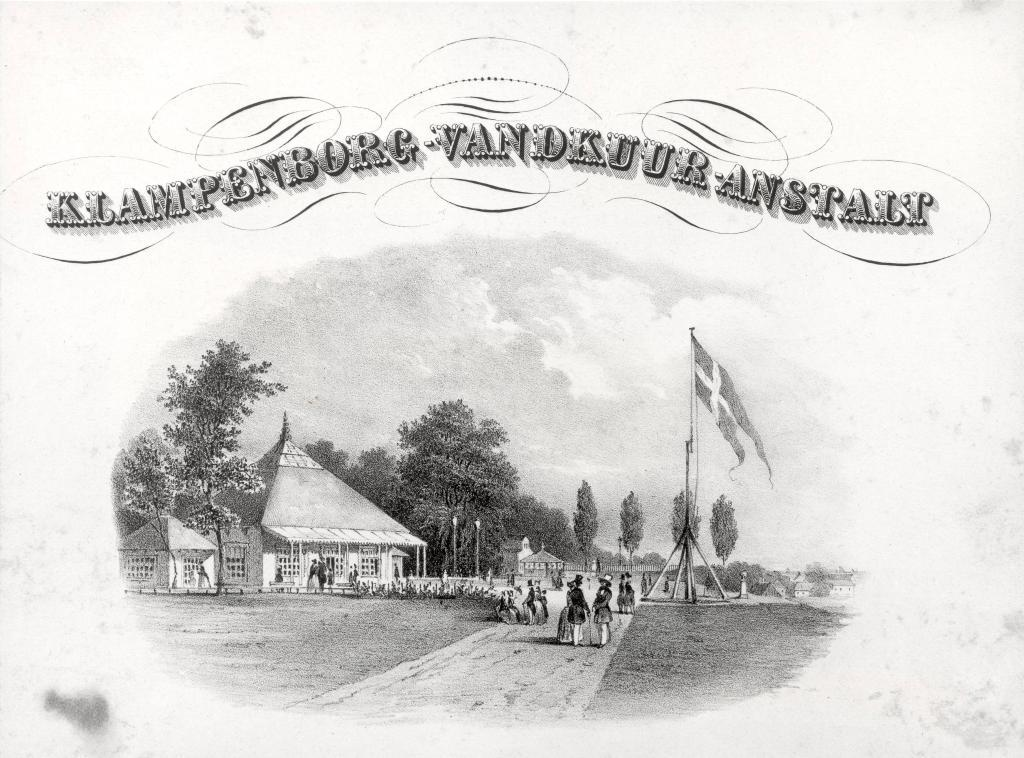
Advertisement for Klampenborg Spa from the 1860s

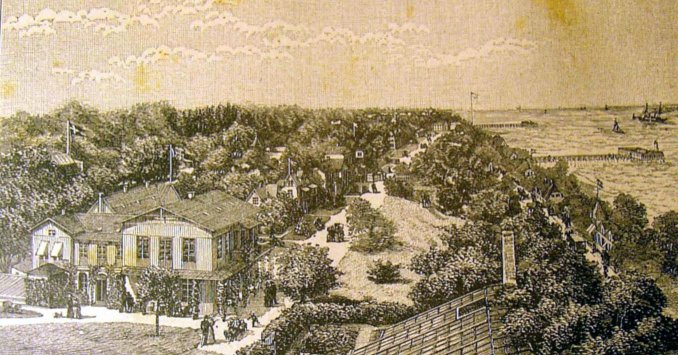
Klampenborg Spa viewed on a lithography from 1888

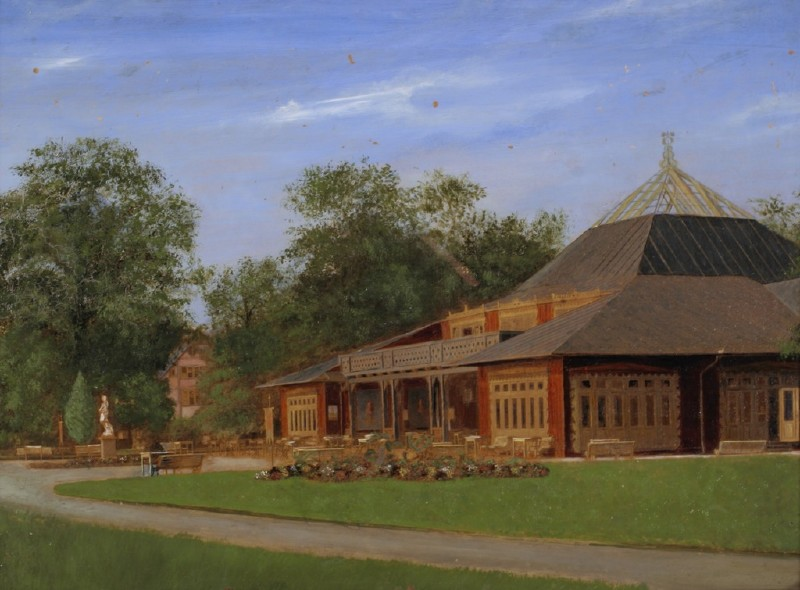
The concert hall

The site was originally part of Jægersborg Dyrehave. The area was planted with oak trees by the botanist Johann Georg von Langen in 1765. The trees were meant to abate the shortage of timber in Denmark.

In 1841, the young Icelandic-Danish physician Jón Hjaltalin studied spas in Germany. In 1844, he acquired a corner of the deer park from Christian VIII and obtained permission to build Denmark's first spa at the site. The architect, Michael Gottlieb Bindesbøll, who was working on Thorvaldsens Museum in Copenhagen, one of the most high-profile projects of the time, was commissioned to design the buildings. Klampenborg Vandkuur-, Brønd- og Søbadeanstalt opened on 15 June 1845.

The facility consisted of a number of residential cottages in English garden style as well as an amusement park with concert hall and various stalls. A new main building was constructed in 1866.

Most of Klampenborg Spa's buildings burned in 1923. The spa was replaced by Arne Jacobsen's new Bellevue beach and bathing facility in 1932 and most of the buildings were demolished when the Danish state took over the site in 1938. The Red Cottage was used as a forest officer house. It was listed in 1973.

== Buildings ==
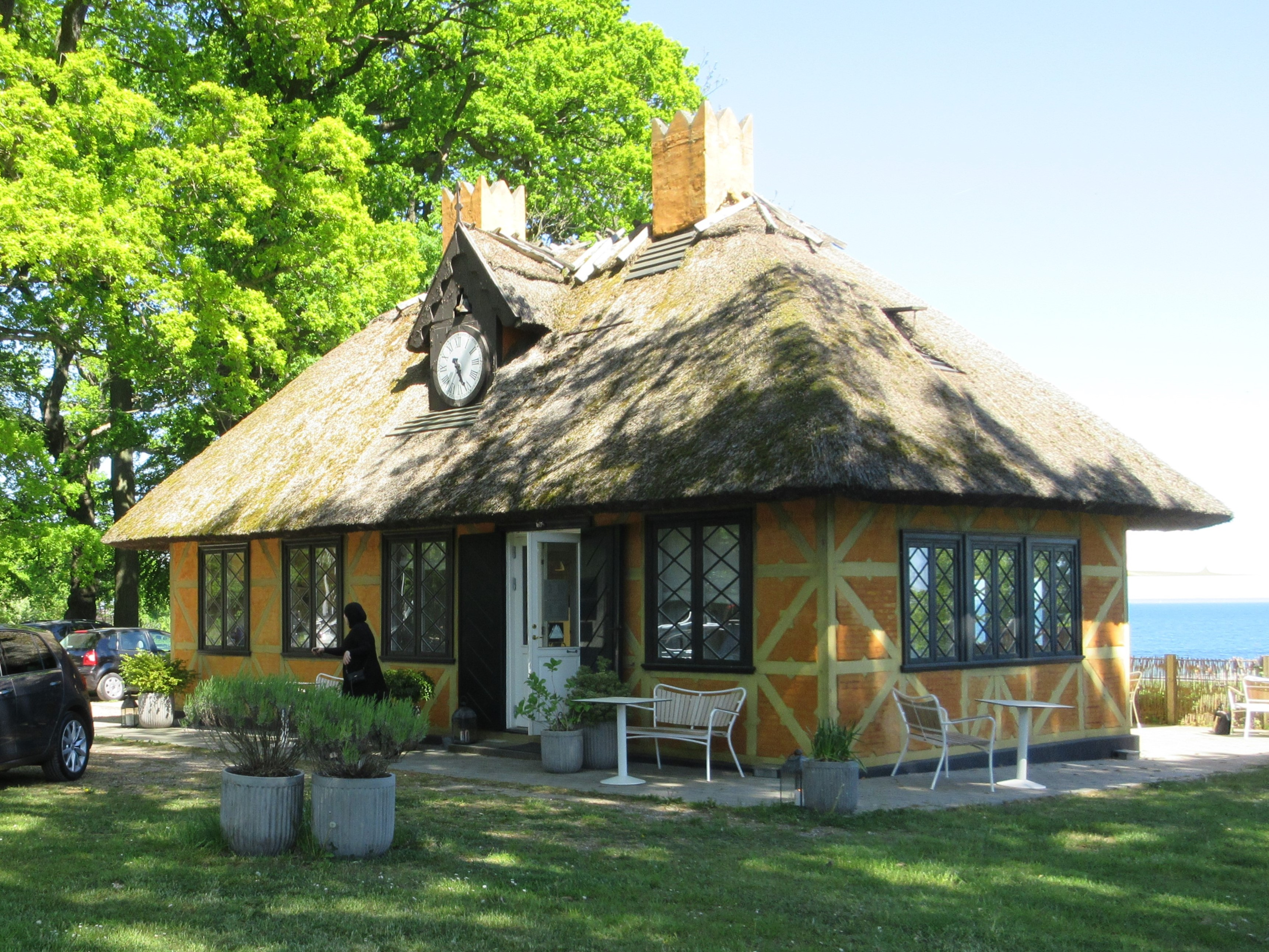
The Yellow Cottage

Four of Klampenborg Spa's buildings have survived. Den Røde Cottage is a former kitchen building.

Den Gule Cottage is a former gatehouse. The building has a thatched roof. The clock on the roof was built by the clockmaker Henrik Kühl, who just a few years later won international recognition for his clocks at the Great Exhibition in London in 1851.
