= Anita Klemensen =

Danish chef (born 1977)

- Born: 1977 (age 48–49); Denmark
- Culinary career
- Cooking style: New Nordic cuisine
- Rating
- Michelin stars
- Current restaurants
- Den Røde Cottage; Den Gule Cottage

Anita Klemensen (born 1977) is a Danish chef, who held a Michelin star at New Nordic cuisine restaurant Den Røde Cottage, which she also co-owned. She was the first female Danish chef to win a star. After eight years Klemensen closed the restaurant at the end of 2017. In 2018 the restaurant re-opened under new management.

== Career ==
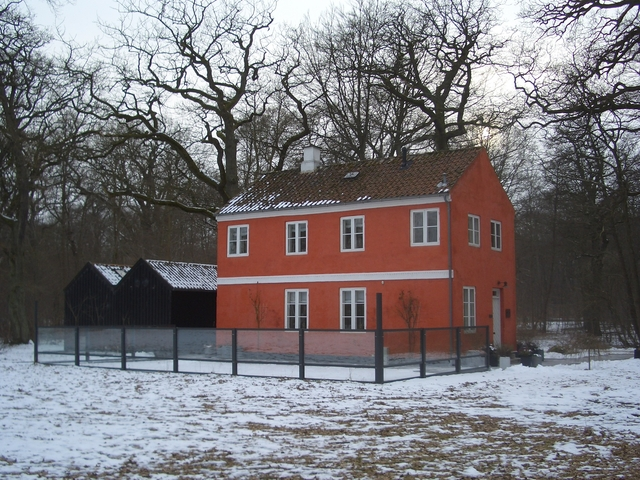
Den Røde Cottage

Anita Klemensen was born in 1977, and grew up in North Jutland County. She wanted to become a chef, so one day offered to work for free at the restaurant Søllerød Kro, where she was offered an apprenticeship. She trained under pastry chef Markus Grigogav and head chef Casper Vedel.

Klemensen opened the restaurant Den Røde Cottage, and the cafe Den Gule Cottage in 2010, at Cottageparken located around ten miles away from Copenhagen. She had previously worked as head chef in central Copenhagen.

At Den Røde Cottage, Klemensen served New Nordic cuisine. This means that all of the elements served are sourced from in the local area, with a few exceptions which are sourced from elsewhere in Denmark. The restaurant itself is within a forest, which offers a plentiful supply of herbs during warmer months. She kept to a seasonal menu, featuring dishes such as Onions, Onions, Onions which had onions served in four different ways during the winter. She took British chef Rick Stein foraging while he was researching his book Rick Stein's Long Weekends.

When she was told that she had won a Michelin star at the restaurant, she did not believe it. The first she heard of it was when a friend telephoned her with congratulations. She knew that the restaurant had been visited on three occasions by the inspectors prior to the 2012 guide, but did not anticipate winning a star. When it was awarded, Klemensen became the first Danish woman to win the accolade.

Klemensen wanted to take some time off and closed down Den Røde Cottage as well as Den Gule Cottage just before Christmas 2017.
