= Karen Bramson =

Danish writer

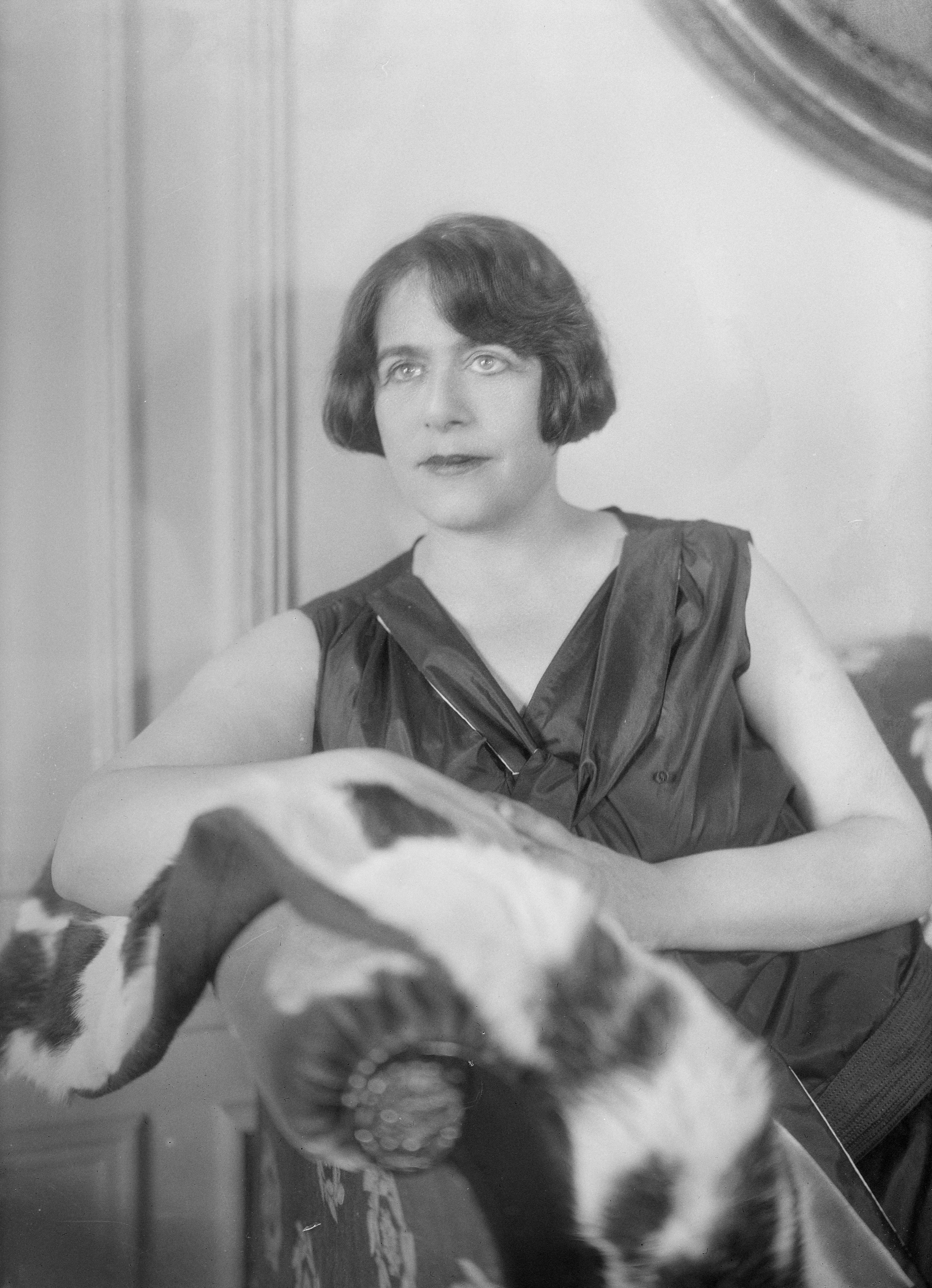
- Karen Bramson by Therese Bonney in July 1930
- Born: Karen Adler; August 10, 1875; Taarbæk, Denmark
- Died: January 26, 1936 (aged 60); Paris, France
- Resting place: the Père Lachaise Cemetery in Paris
- Occupation: Author
- Spouse: Dr. Louis Bramson
- Children: Mogens Bramson
- Relatives: Vera Stanley Alder (niece) Niels Bohr (third cousin)
- Writing career
- Language: Danish and French
- Notable awards: Légion d'honneur 1827 Officier Tagea Brandt Rejselegat; 1934

Signature
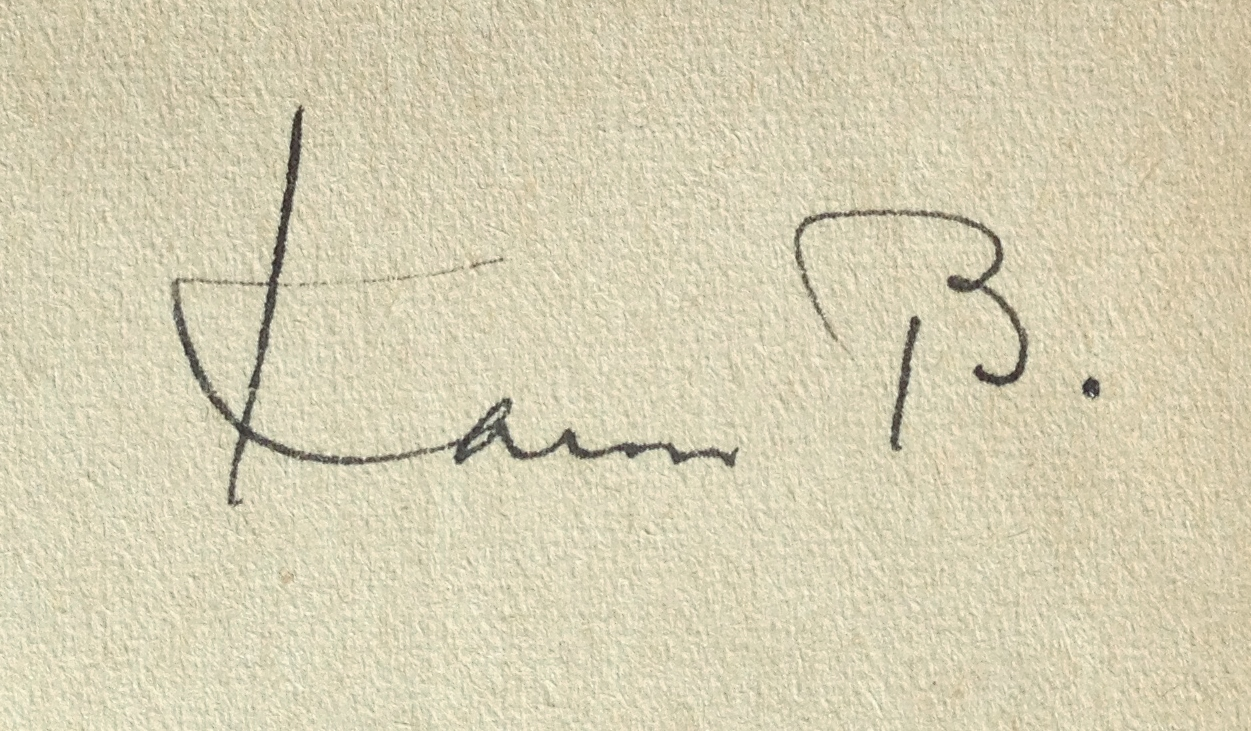

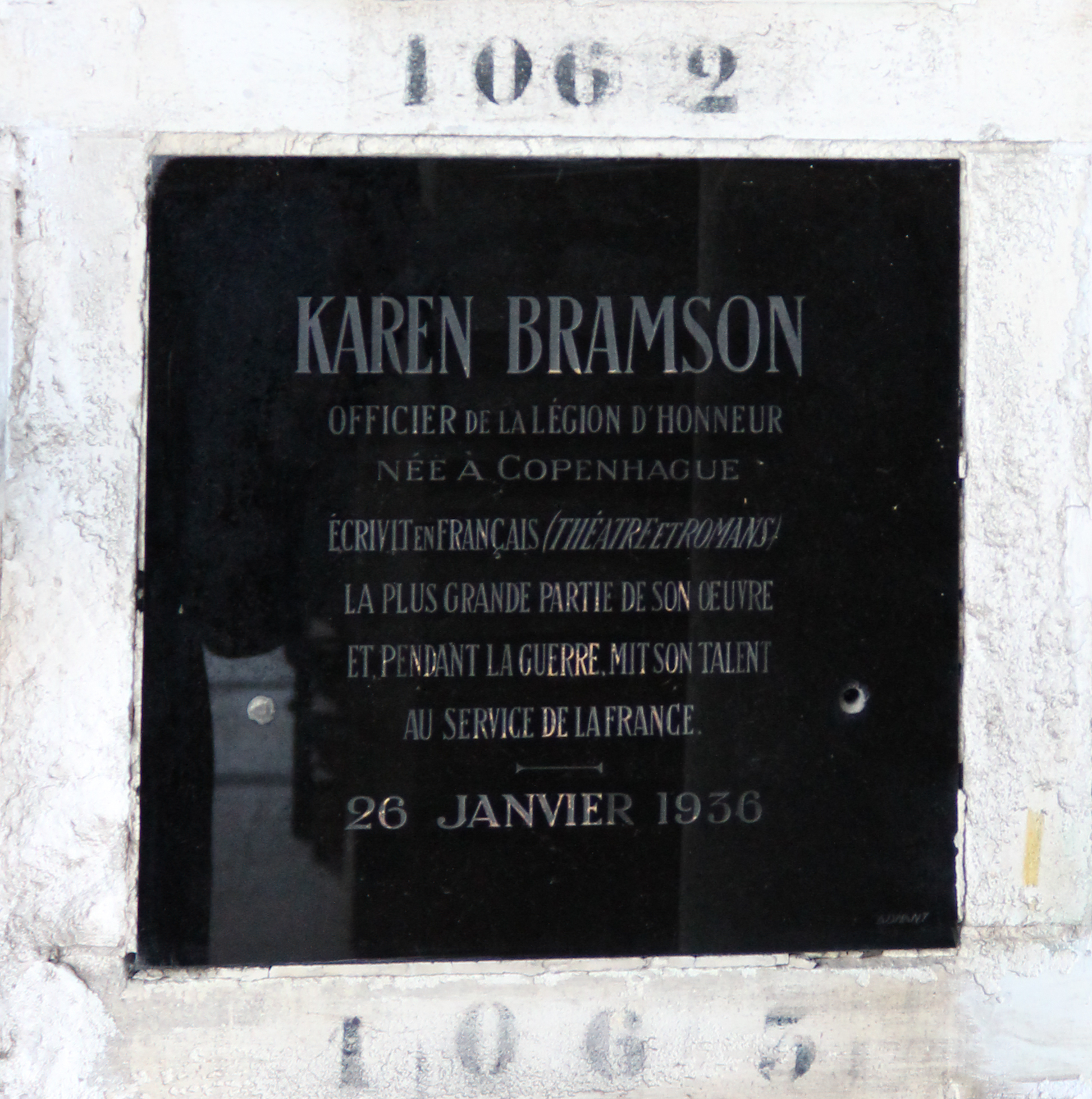
Karen Bramson's grave at the Père Lachaise Cemetery in Paris

Karen Bramson (née Adler; born 10 August 1875 in Taarbæk, Denmark and died 26 January 1936 in Paris, France) was a Danish author who wrote novels and plays mostly in Danish or French although many of her writings have been translated into English.

Bramson spent her early life in Denmark and her later life in France. She was awarded the Légion d'honneur for her work during the First World War and for her contributions to French literature.

== Early life in Denmark ==
Karen Adler was born on August 10, 1875, in Tårbæk, Denmark with parents Julius Frederick Adler a wealthy cigar merchant in Copenhagen and Dorothea (Thea) Monies a second cousin of the physicist Niels Bohr. She had several siblings, one of which was her elder brother, David Julius Adler. Bramson was apparently a better writer than David, because she would sometimes write David Adler's school essays for him. Karen Adler started writing plays at the age of 12 and at 14, had a play in two acts - "Veninder" (Girlfriends) and "I pension for unge piger" (In a boarding house for young girls) - accepted at the Folketeatret (People's Theatre) in Copenhagen for a fee of 200 Danish Kroner. She had insisted that she should remain anonymous, but the theatre director could not resist giving her name to the local newspaper. Bramson hurriedly withdrew her play and refunded the fee to avoid scandal and her father's wrath, for in 1890s Copenhagen, it was unheard of for a young lady of her class to attract such publicity and get paid for writing a play. In 1893, at the age of 17, she married Louis Bramson (b. 1861 - d 1952). Louis, like Karen, came from a relatively prosperous Danish family, was a doctor and was 15 years older than Karen. In 1895, they had a son, Mogens Bramson. Karen Bramson continued to write and made her début in print with the two plays "Den unge Frue. Mands Vilje" (The young lady - Man's Will) published in 1900 and performed in 1907 at the People's Theatre in Copenhagen.

In 1904, Bramson and her husband built a country mansion which they called Solgården (Sun Yard) near the sea in Strøby Egede, Stevns Municipality just south of Copenhagen. They invited artists from different parts of Europe and held plays on a stage they had built there. King Frederick VIII of Denmark is said to have stayed there in 1911 and, in commemoration, is said to have presented Karen with four marble statues of eagles which were placed on the corners of a tower in the building.

In 1912, Bramson was elected a councillor of Copenhagen Municipality but declined, preferring to concentrate on writing. In 1914, Bramson left Denmark and moved to France in a personal protest against Denmark remaining neutral during the World War I. She was to spend the rest of her life in France.

== Later literary career ==
After Bramson settled permanently in Paris, France at the beginning of the First World War, she wrote mostly in French. During the war, she was attached to the press department of the French Ministry of Foreign Affairs, which tried to create international awareness of the country's situation. Bramson was an enthusiastic writer and propagandist for the French cause and tried to help the plight of French prisoners of war in Germany. She was awarded the rank of Chevalier in the Légion d'honneur in 1917 for the work she did during the First World War.

After the war, her greatest triumph was the performance in 1923 of her play "Le Professeur Klenow" at the Theatre de l'Odeon in Paris with actor Poul Reumert in the lead role. Later in 1923 there was a reworked version of her 1902 play, "Den Stærkeste" (The Strongest), as guest performance at the Royal Theatre in Copenhagen. Shortly before, at the same theatre, her play "De evige Fjender" (The Eternal Enemies) with Reumert and the actress Bodil Ipsen in the lead roles met with limited success. However, in June 1924 the same play translated into English with the title "Tiger Cats" and starring Edith Evans, Nicholas Hannen and Robert Loraine was performed at the Garrick Theatre and then the Royal Strand Theatre in London, where it was much more successful and ran for 116 performances. "Tiger Cats", directed by David Belasco also ran for 48 performances in the Belasco Theatre on Broadway in New York with Katharine Cornell and Robert Lorraine in the lead roles. Other plays by Karen Bramson performed about this time were "The Strong" at the Forty-Ninth Street Theatre, New York (1924) and in England "Medusa" (1926), "The Godless" (Wyndhams theatre December 1925), "The Enchantress" (The Garrick Theatre April 1926), "The Man they Buried" (The Ambassadors Theatre June 1928) and "The Tower of Babel" (Venturers Society July 1929). "Tiger Cats" was revived at the Royalty theatre in May 1931 with Edith Evans and Robert Lorraine in the same roles as before. In 1925 she was the first foreign female author to have a play accepted at the Comédie-Française in Paris. Other plays of hers performed in Paris included "Puissance de Roi" (Odéon Theatre), "Des yeux qui s'ouvrent" (also at the Odéon) and "Bonheur" (Ambassadeurs theatre). She was made an Officer in the Légion d'honneur in 1927 because of her contributions to French literature and plays. In 1934 she also received the Tagea Brandt Rejselegat Danish award. Bramson was known in fashionable circles in Paris had a reputation for being a brilliant hostess inviting artists, diplomats and politicians to receptions in her house. For example, she was friends with the poet and diplomat Saint-John Perse (who was awarded the Nobel Prize for Literature), the diplomat Philippe Berthelot, his wife Hélène and the French politician Louis Barthou. Despite her versatile talents, her literary ambitions and a life in the media spotlight, her inner personality was mostly hidden. She disliked giving interviews and was reticent about divulging details of her personal life.

== Personal life ==
Bramson and her husband had one son, Mogens Louis Bramson After 1914, she lived apart from her husband, but had a friendly relationship with him throughout her life. She adored her son Mogens, who was a pilot and aviation engineering consultant. Mogens Bramson lived much of his life in England and played a crucial role in helping Frank Whittle develop the world's first jet engine. Later in his life, Mogens moved to California, USA where he invented a heart lung machine. One source says Karen Bramson's older sister Olga married the Russian Prince Vladimir Orloff. Karen's brother David Julius Adler was the father of the author and painter Vera Stanley Alder.

== Later life and death ==
In her final years, she retired from public life and studied spiritualism. She had always loved a cosmopolitan life and travelled throughout Europe staying in various hotels before dying in 1936 of a cerebral hemorrhage in a hotel room in Paris. Her ashes were buried at the Père Lachaise cemetery in Paris. (Note: There is no printed biography of Karen Bramson. She is mentioned in some dictionaries and encyclopaedias of Danish authors.)

== Reception and legacy ==
Her first plays ("The Young Lady", "Man's Will" in 1900 and "Mothers" in 1901 ) have been described as focussing on the oppression women suffer in marriage and she often explored themes of interpersonal relationships and the battle of the sexes. Deadly love and female masochist tendencies have also been mentioned by reviewers. One newspaper review of her play "Tiger Cats" noted the London audience "...consisting mainly of middle-aged, unmarried women cheered wildly these scenes of sadism." She has also been described as a feminist and a writer of science fiction in the near future. In 1932 she was regarded by some critics as "the most significant figure in Nordic literature since Ibsens time." The opinion of The Times obituary in January 1936 was that she was perhaps more successful as a novelist than a playwright - in particular for her books "Parmi les hommes" (a vast fresco of Europe before and after World War 1 including the curious character of Lenin), "Un seul homme" (an analysis of an English revolutionary), "Nous les barbares" (a study of middle-class life of her day) and "Star" (the story of a young girl and Hollywood).

== Works ==
- Den unge Frue. Mands Vilje (The Young Lady. Man's Will; 1900, two plays in Danish published together,)
- Mødre (Mothers; 1901, play in Danish also translated into German)
- Den Stærkeste (The Strongest; 1902, play in Danish also translated into English as Professor Klenov, into French and Arabic.)
- Det lyriska versdramat Berengaria, Dronning af Danmark (Berengaria, Queen of Denmark, in lyrical verse; 1904, play in Danish)
- Livets Glæde (Life's Joy; 1905, in Danish also translated into Finnish)
- Vore Kælebørn (skrevet af et af dem) (Our Pet Children (written by one of them); 1905, play four acts in Danish)
- Dr Morel (1906, novel in Danish, also translated into English by David Stanley-Alder as The Case of Dr. Morel,, Russian, Bulgarian, and self-translated into French.)
- Pengene (The Money; 1908, novel in Danish),
- Ærtehalm (Peas in a Pod; 1909, play in Danish by Karen Bramson and Gustav Wied)
- Lykke (Happiness; 1910, in Danish)
- samt Kongemagt (The King; 1911, play in Danish also translated into German and Russian)
- Mennesker af vor Tid (People of our Time; 1916, novel in Danish also into French by Karen Bramson as Une femme libre)
- Det store Drama (The Great Drama; 1922, novel in Danish also translated into French as Parmi les hommes)
- De evige Fjender(The Eternal Enemies; 1923, play in Danish also translated into English as Tiger Cats and into French as les félines)
- Des yeux qui s'ouvrent (Eyes that Open; 1925, play in French)
- The Godless (1925 play translated into English)
- Le dictateur (The Dictator; 1925 play in French)
- The Man They Buried (1928, comedy translated into English by Bertha Murrey, 1928)
- La femme fatale (1926, in French, also translated into English as Medusa or The Enchantress
- The Tower of Babel (1929, play)
- Nous, les barbares... (We the Barbarians ...; 1929, novel in French, also translated into Spanish)
- Théâtre (1929–30; Compendium of 12 of Karen Bramson's plays in French in four volumes: L'argent {une famille-l'enfer-La tour de Babel}, L'amour {Le professeur Klenow-Méduse-Le Bonheur}, La foi {L'orgueilleux-L'homme qui a compris-Les yeux qui s'ouvrent} and La haine {Le dictateur-Les félines-Depuis l'aurore des temps})
- Men (1930)
- Une amoureuse (A Lover; 1930, in French, also translated into Spanish)
- Une nuit d'amour (A Night of Love; 1931, in French also translated into Norwegian)
- Un seul homme (One Man; 1932, novel in French)
- En Nat (One Night; 1932, novel in Danish)
- Star (1933, novel in French)
- Lueur dans nos ténèbres (Light Among our Shadows; 1935, novel in French)
