= Theodor Wessel =

Danish businessman

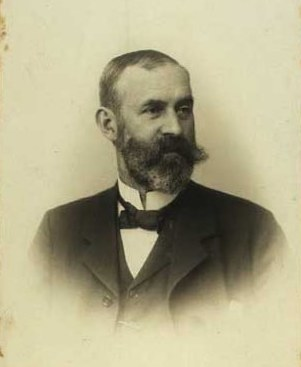
- Wessel photographed by Julie Laurberg
- Born: 27 February 1842; Odense, Denmark
- Died: 31 July 1905 (aged 63); Årbæk, Denmark
- Occupation: Businessman
- Known for: Magasin du Nord

Theodor Wilhelm Wessel (27 February 1842 – 31 July 1905) was a Danish businessman. He is remembered as one of the two founders of the Magasin du Nord chain of department stores.

== Early life and education ==
Wessel was born on 27 February 1842 in Odense, the elder of two sons of customs assistant Herman Hinrich Wessel (1802–78) and Wilhelmine Rasmussen (1810–1865). His father's family had originally come to Denmark from Vremen and was thus unrelated to the other Danish Werssel family originating in Norway (cf. Peter Wessel, Johan Herman Wessel). Aged 14 Wessel was apprenticed to L. J. Baagøe, who operated a substantial linnen and drapery business in association with a grocery shop in Svendborg.

Wessel's younger brother Peter (Pedro) Wessel (27 September 1851 – 8 February 1921) emigrated to Chile in 1876, where he established his own trading house in Caracoles.

== Career ==
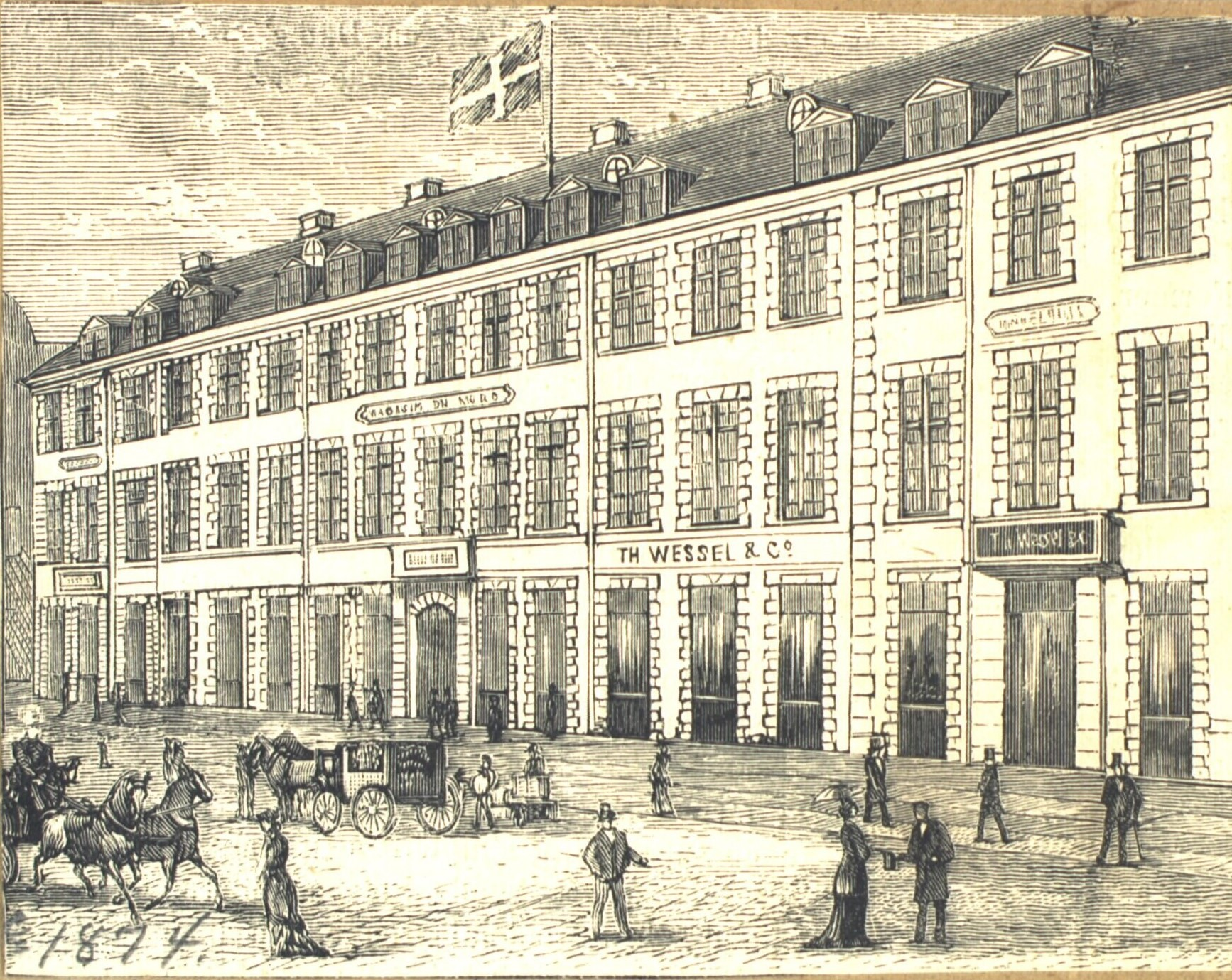
Hotel du Nord with a Wessel & Co. sign, 1874

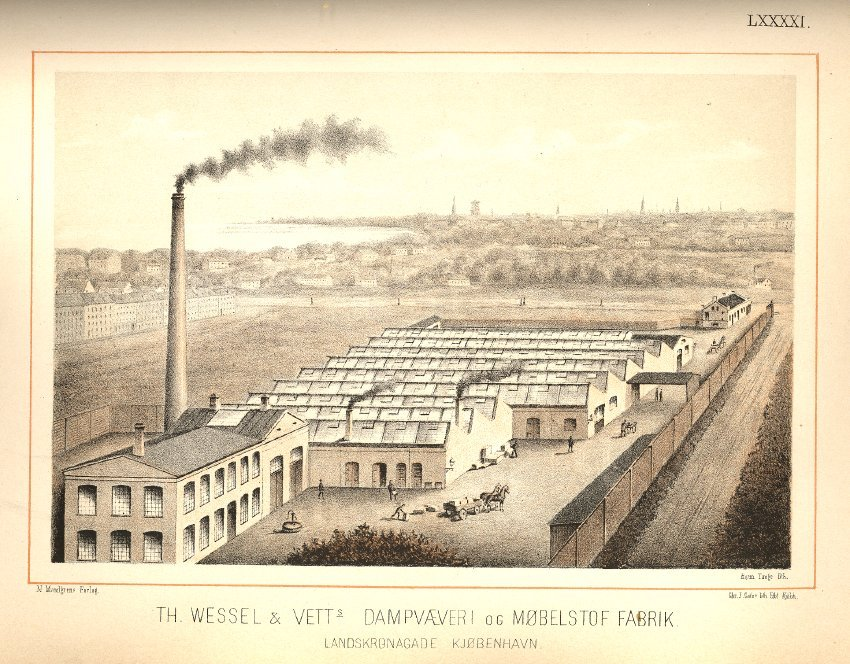
Th. Wessel & Vetts Dampvæveri og Møbelstof-Fabrik

On completing his apprenticeship in 1864, Wessel was employed as a travelling salesman by M. E. Grøn & Søn in Copenhagen. In 1867, he went on a journey to England and France, where he visited the Exposition Universelle in Paris. The impressions from this journey made him decide to start his own business. When he shortly thereafter met Emil Vett on a random visit to Aarhus, the two businessmen decided to join forces, on 14 April 1868 starting a small linnen and drapery business under the name Emil Vett & Co.. Vett was in the beginning responsible for the daily operations while Wessel for the first few years was employed as a travelling purchaser for I. H. Ruben in Copenhagen, but with a right also to act on behalf of his own venture on his journeys abroad.

In 1870, Emil Vett & Co. opened a branch in Aalborg, soon followed by branches in other provincial towns. The wholesale operations was at the same time moved to Copenhagen as an independent firm under the name Th. Wessel & Co. with Wessel as management. In 1872, Th. Wessel & Co. relocated from Østergade to Hotel du Nord's building on Kongens Nytorv and the name was at the same time changed to De forenede Hvidevare Forretninger ved Th. Wessel & Co.. Both firms continued to grow rapidly. In 1876, when Vett joined Wessel in Copenhagen, Th. Wessel & Co. was renamed Th. Wessel & Vett. On 4 January 1879, Magasin du Nord was introduced as the brand name of all their retail outlets across the country.

In 1889, Th. Wessel & Vett acquired the building next to Hotel du Nord. In 1890, it also purchased the hotel building. In 1892–93, both buildings were demolished to make way for a new department store. In the late 1880s, Th. Wessel & Vett also constructed its own textile factory in Landskronagade while seamstress floors and other workshops were established both in-house and in other locations across Copenhagen. In 1898, a furniture factory was constructed next to the textile factory in Landskronagade.

On 10 November 1899, Th. Wessel & Vett was converted into a limited company (aktueseksjab). Wessel was from then on a member of the board while the daily operations were left in the hands of the directors.

== Personal life ==
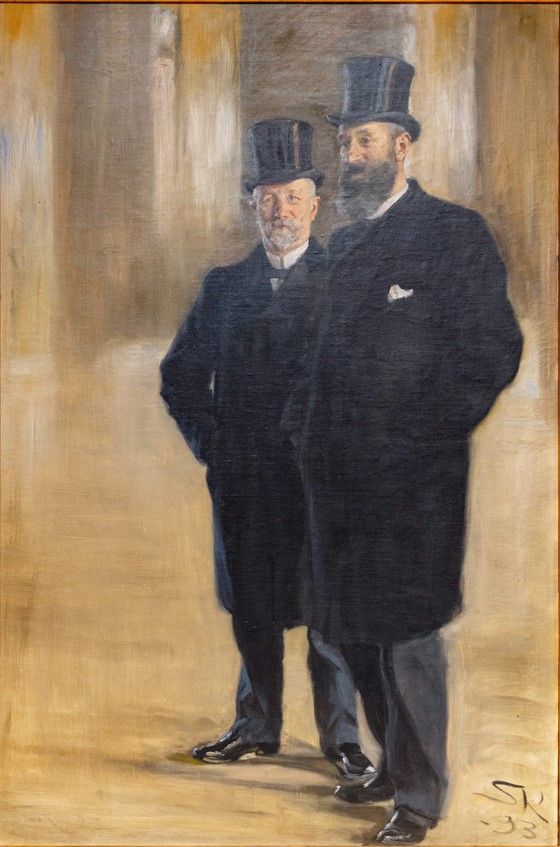
P. S. Krøyer's portrait study of Wessel and Vett for From Copenhagen Stock Exchange

On 24 October 1868, Wessel married Elise Margarethe Christiane Sørenson (29 December 1849 – 8 May 1933), daughter of merchant Hans Jordt Sørensen (1815–1909) and Charlotte Amalie Martini (1824–55), with whom he had two daughters.

He constructed a villa in Taarbæk to designs by the architect Johan Schrøder. Schrøder had also designed the textile factory in Landskronagade.

Wessel is one of the men seen in Peder Severin Krøyer's monumental 1895 oil on canvas group portrait painting From Copenhagen Stock Exchange (Børsen). Krøyer also painted a study of the detail with Wessel and Vatt in 1893 (Magasin du Nord). Otto Bache painted a portrait painting of Wessel in 1890 (Frederiksborg Castle). Ludvig Brandstrup created a portrait bust of him (Magasin du Nord).

Wessel died on 31 July 1905 in Taarbæk and is buried in the local Taarbæk Cemetery. His grave monument was created by Søren Lemche.

== Accolades ==
Wessel was created a Knight in the Order of the Dannebrog in 1888 and was awarded the Cross of Honour in 1904.

== See also ==
- Niels Wessel Bagge Art Foundation
