= Emil Vett =

Danish businessman

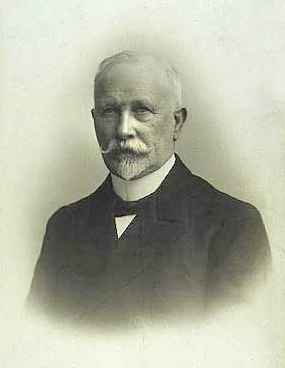
- Emil Vett
- Born: 7 November 1843; Rødby, Denmark
- Died: 18 February 1911 (aged 67); Copenhagen, Denmark
- Occupation: Businessman

Emil Vett (7 November 1843 – 18 February 1911) was a Danish businessman who was a co-founder of Magasin du Nord.

== Early life and education ==
Vatt was born on 7 November 1843 in Rødby on Lolland, the son of medical doctor Julius Theodor Emil Vett (1808–1869) and Karen Petrine Bjørn (1813–1881). At the age of 14, he became an apprentice in C. B. Christensen's textile shop in Aarhus. He worked in the shop for a total of nine years and ended up heading it for around a year after the owner had fallen ill. After C. B. Christensen's death, Vett worked briefly in Emil Secher's fashion shop.

== Career ==
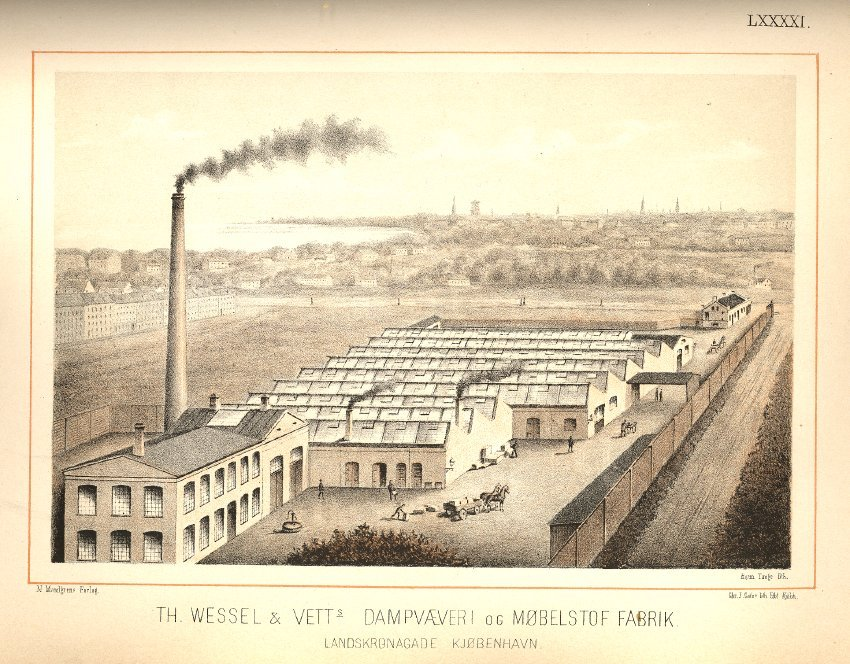
Th. Wessel & Vetts Dampvæveri og Møbelstof-Fabrik

In 1868 Vett established Emil Vett & Co. in a partnership with Theodor Wessel. In 1876 Vett and Wessel moved the firm to Copenhagen. Over the next years it developed into the largest department store in the country under the name Magasin du Nord. The firm established its own textile factory on Landskronagade in Østerbro in 1887.

== Other activities ==
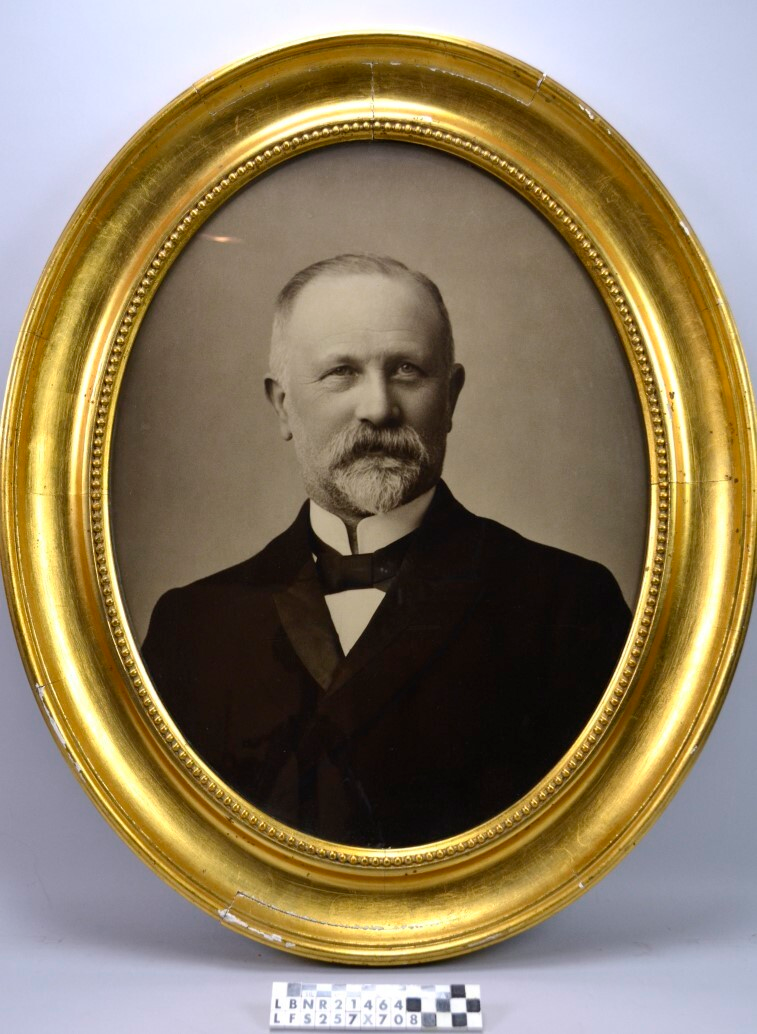
Emil Vett .

After partly retiring from the day-to-day management of his firm, in around 1900, Vett took active part in a number of charities such as the Danish Tuberculosis Society (Nationalforeningen til tuberkulosens bekæmpelse), Julemærkefonden and the organisation behind Høstblomsten. He was also involved in the establishment of Idrætsparken in Østerbro.

From 1885 to 1911 he was a specialist member of the Maritime and Commercial Court (Sø-og handelsretten) and from 1904 to 1911 he was a member of Bank of Denmark's Board of Representatives.

In 1893 Vett and Wessel established a pension and welfare fund (pensions-og understøttelseskasse) for the employees in the firm.

== Personal life and legacy ==
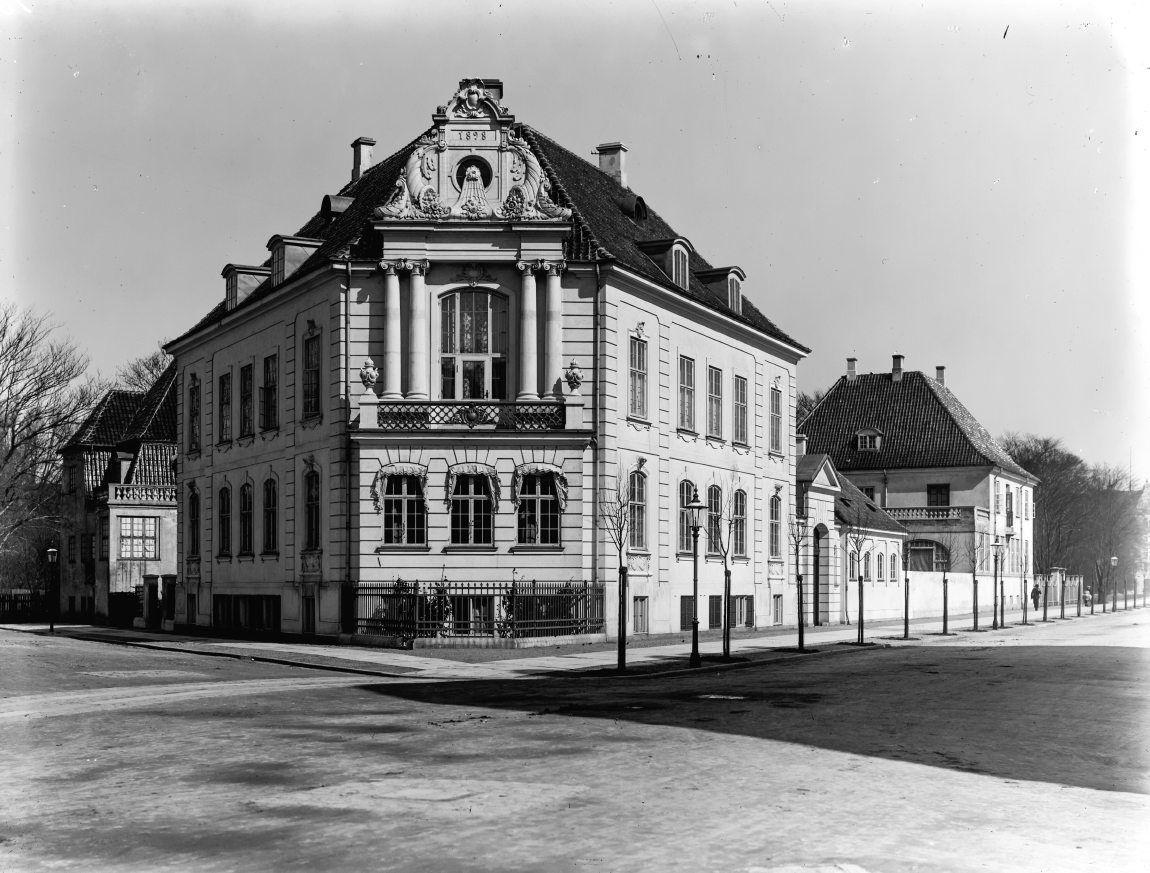
Vett's villa at Kristianiagade 7 in Copenhagen

Vett married Caroline Adolphine Langballe (15 September 1849 – 8 February 1935), a daughter of merchant Carl L. (1805–1885) and Hansine Palline Pallesen (1814–1868), on 27 April 1870.

Vett constructed the villa at Kritianiagade 7 in 1898. It was designed by Johan Schrøder. Vett was also the owner of a summer residence designed by the same architect in Taarbæk on the coast north of the city.

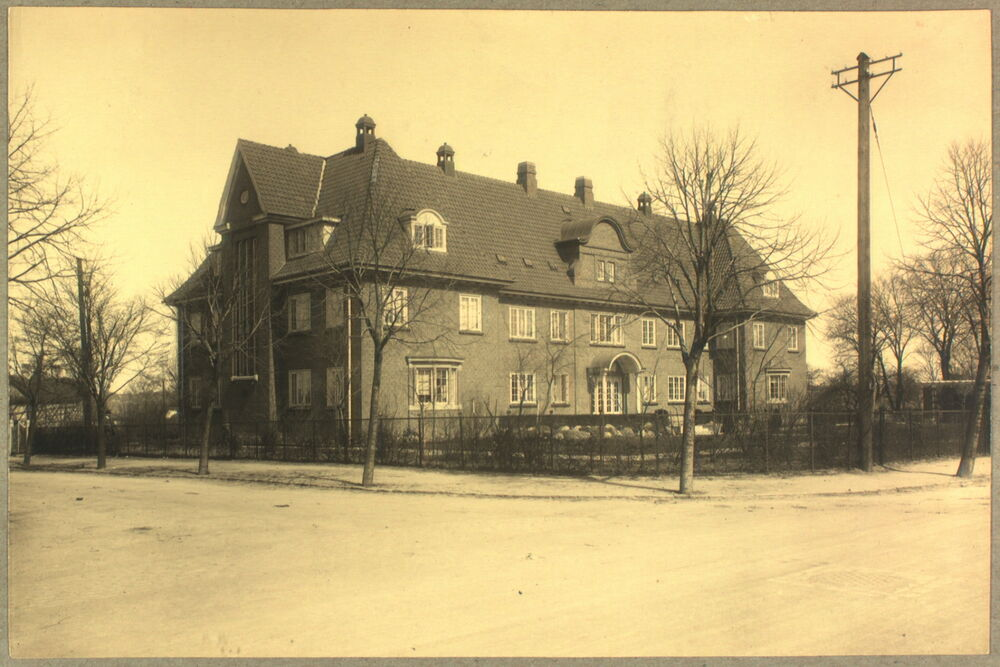
Vetts Stiftelse.

Vett was made a Knight in the Order of the Dannebrog in 1896 and was awarded the Cross of Honour in 1908 and the Medal of Merit in Gold in 1909. He died on 18 February 1911 and is buried at Taarbæk Cemetery.

Vett's widow constructed Emil Vetts of Hustrus Stiftelse at C.F. Richs Vej 18 in Frederiksberg. The building was designed by Edmund Monberg and was used as a summer residence for employees at Magasin du Nord.
