= Taarbæk =

- Neighbourhood
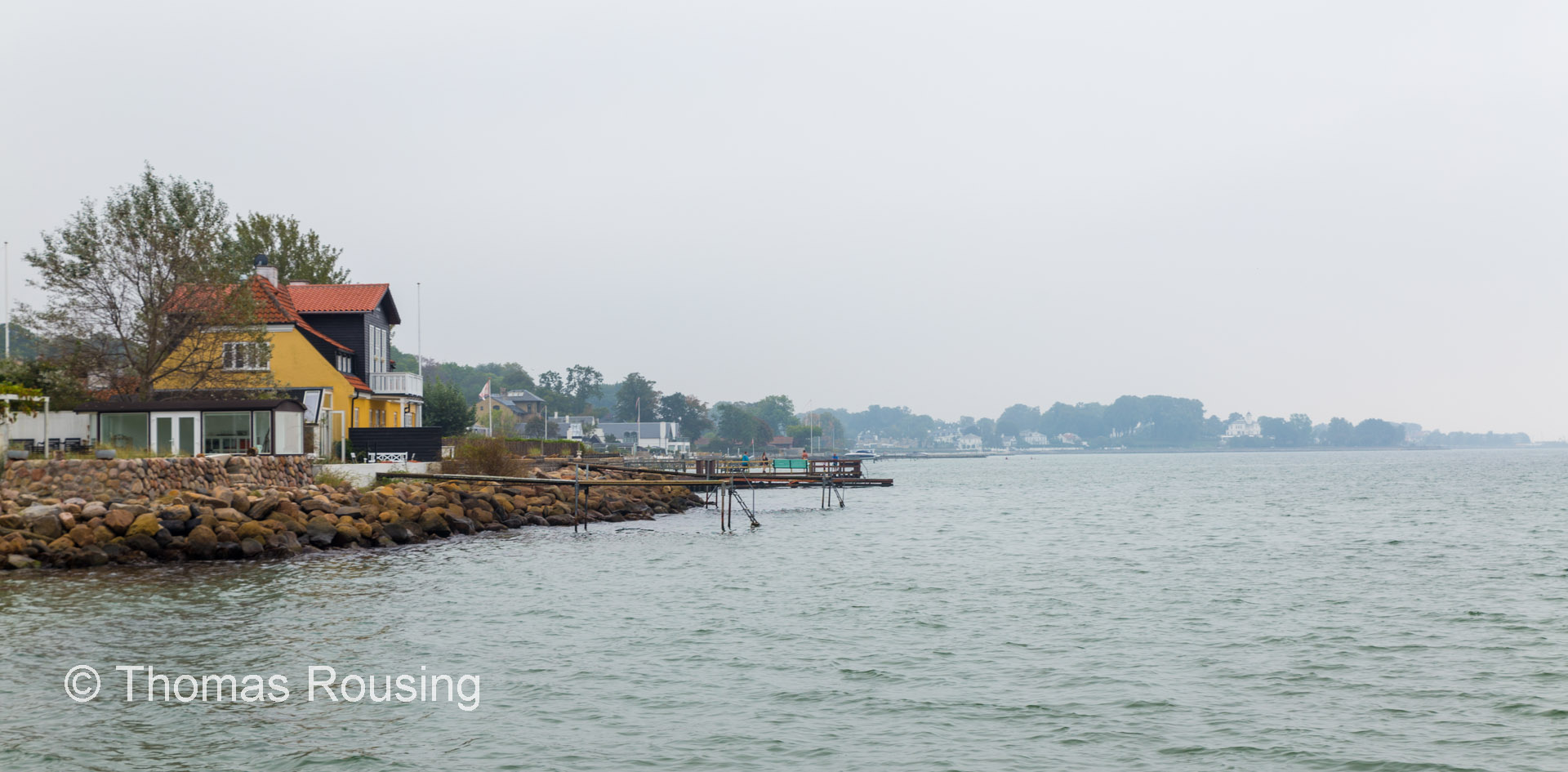
- Taarbæk Harbour

- Location in the Capital Region of Denmark
- Coordinates: 55.7872°N 12.5911°E
- Country: Denmark
- Region: Capital Region
- Municipality: Lyngby-Taarbæk
- Time zone: UTC+1 (CET)
  - Summer (DST): UTC+2 (CEST)

Taarbæk is a neighbourhood in Lyngby-Taarbæk Municipality. The neighbourhood covers approximately 0.5 km^{2}, located between Jægersborg Dyrehave and Øresund. The population is estimated to ca. 1700 residents. Traditionally, Taarbæk was a fishing village but, nowadays, the village is inhabited by people from the middle or upper class. Taarbæk is named after a former village called Torsbæk, which was located just north of where Taarbæk is today. The giant container ship Emma Mærsk is home-ported in Taarbæk.

Despite its small size, Taarbæk has its own school, church, port, tennis club, water skiing club and football club. The water skiing club is among the best in Denmark. The football club Taarbæk IF, is one of the oldest football clubs in Denmark, founded on August 23, 1908.

== History ==
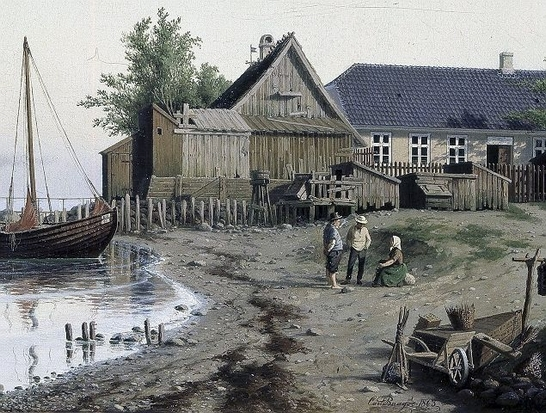
The beach where Taarbæk Harbour was later built

Taarbæk was established as a fishing village in the 17th century. It was originally called Thorsbæk, meaning Thor's Stream, a reference to a local stream. The village had no harbor, the fishing boats were pulled up on the beach. Most of the fish were sold on the fish market at Gammel Strand in Copenhagen. The village belonged to the parish of Kongens Lyngby.

An inn opened in about 1800. On 22 May 1730, it received a royal license to brew its own beer and make its own aquavit. The innkeeper had to pay his tax to the king in cod.

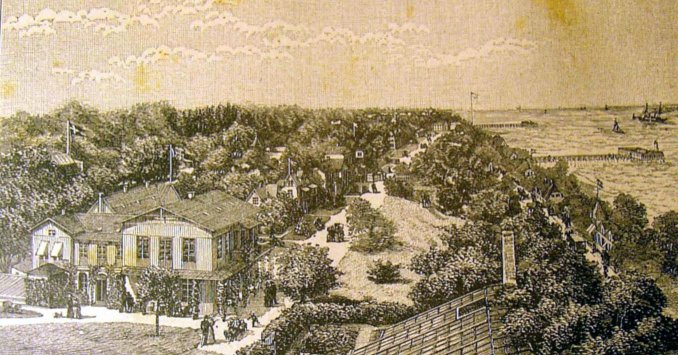
Klampenborg Spa viewed on a lithography from 1888

In 1821, local residents started working for Taarbæk to get its own school and church room. The school opened in a building which was donated to the project by the two English owners.

Taarbæk became a spa town when Klampenborg Vandkuur-, Brønd- og Søbadeanstalt opened in 1845. The section for women was located at Taarbæk while the section for men was located a little further to the south in Klampenborg. The number of summer visitors grew steadily. Some stayed with the local fishermen while other built their own country houses.

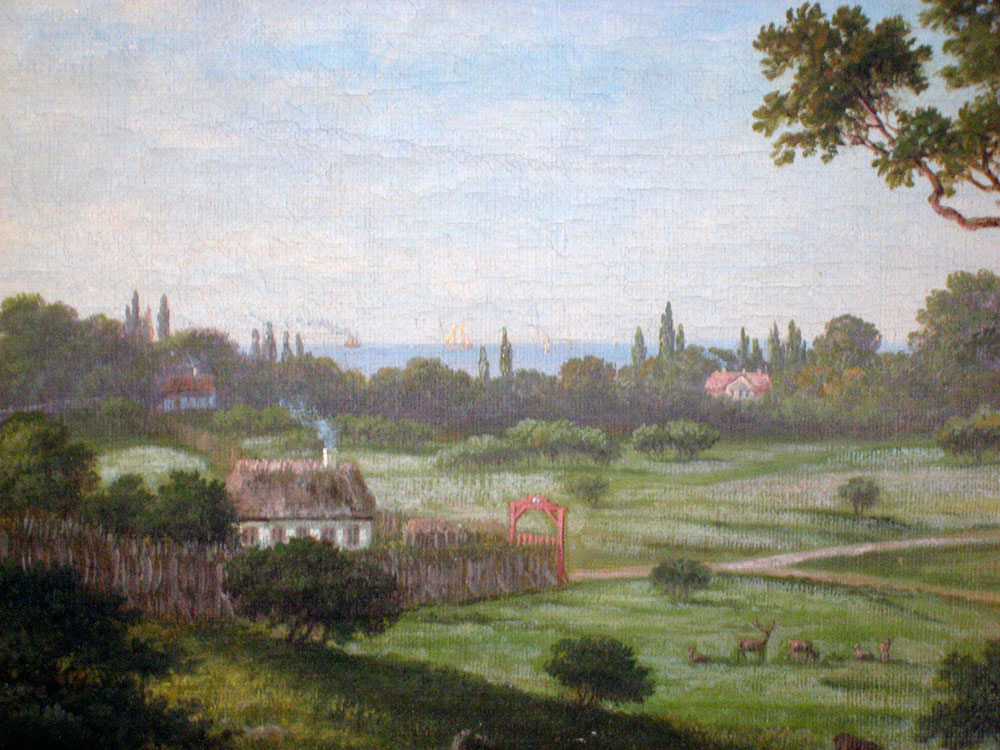
View of Taarbæk from Jægersborg Dyrehave in 1879

In the 1860s, Taarbæk began to change even faster. A key event was the opening of the Klampenborg Railway in 1863. The area to the south of the village was built over with summer residences. In 1864, the town finally got its own church. Taarbæk Harbour, with room for 70 small boats, was built in 1865.

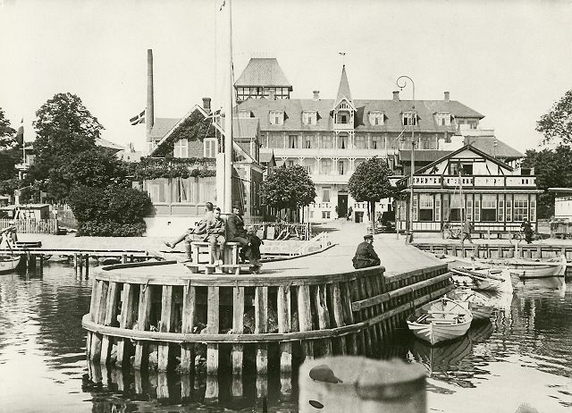
Taarbæk Harbour with the now demolished hotel building (centre) and inn (right)

In the 1880s, a new district known as Ny Taarbæk ("New Taarbæk") formed to the north of the village when wealthy people from Copenhagen began to construct summer residences in the area. The new residents included the two Magasin du Nord founders Theodor Wessel and Emil Vett. Connections to Copenhagen improved even more with the opening of the Coast Line in 1884, although trevallers to and from Taarbæk still had to use Klampenborg station. A hotel was built in the 1890s. In 1909, the civil parisk of Lyngby was renamed Lyngby-Taarbæk in recognition of the growing importance of the new coastal district. A new school was built in 1916. The hotel was demolished in 1936 and the inn was demolished in 1940 as Taarbæk changed from a quiet resort town to a modern suburb.

== Sights ==
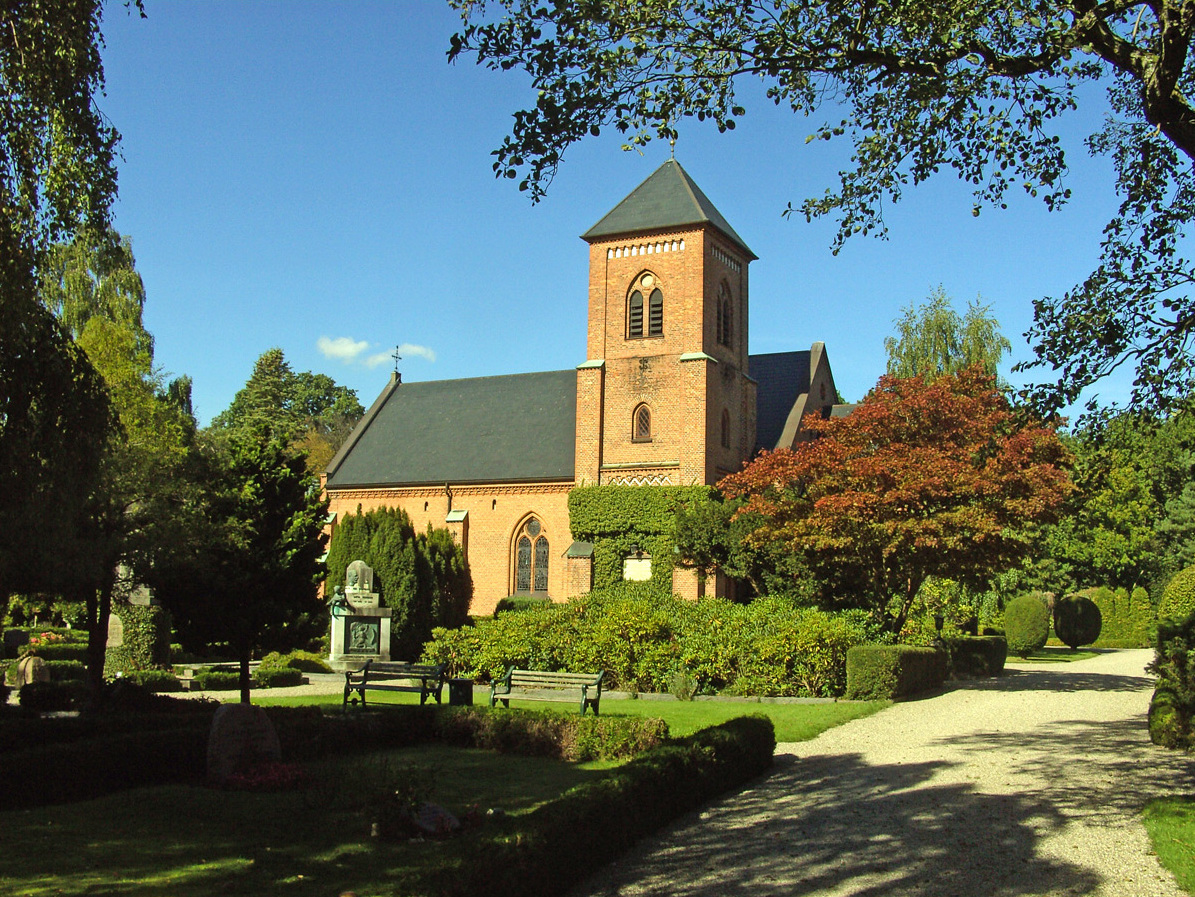
Taarbæk Church

Taarbæk Church is from 1864. It was designed by the architect C.E. Wessel. Taarbæk Cemetery was established in 1905.

Only three of the buildings from Klampenborg Spa have survived. Part of the area has been turned into a small park, Cottageparken, which contains two of the buildings. The Yellow Cottage (Den Gule Cottage) is a former gatehouse. The Red Cottage (Den Røde Cottage) now houses a one Michelin star restaurant. The third surviving building, a two-story, wooden building, is located at Tårbæk Strandvej 82. All three were designed by Michael Gottlieb Bindesbøll and are listed.

== Notable people ==
- Karen Bramson (1875 — 1936), author
- Henning Moritzen (1928 — 2012), actor
