= Charlottendal =

Historic building and estate south of Slagelse, Denmark

- Interactive map of the Charlottendal area

General information
- Location: Charlottedal Allé 4; 4200 Slagelse, Denmark
- Coordinates: 55°22′53″N 11°22′56″E
- Completed: ?

Charlottendal is a historic building and estate situated south of Slagelse, Denmark. Created by Constantin Brun in 1799, it is today part of Antvorskov Barracks.

== History ==
=== Early owners, 1797–1810 ===
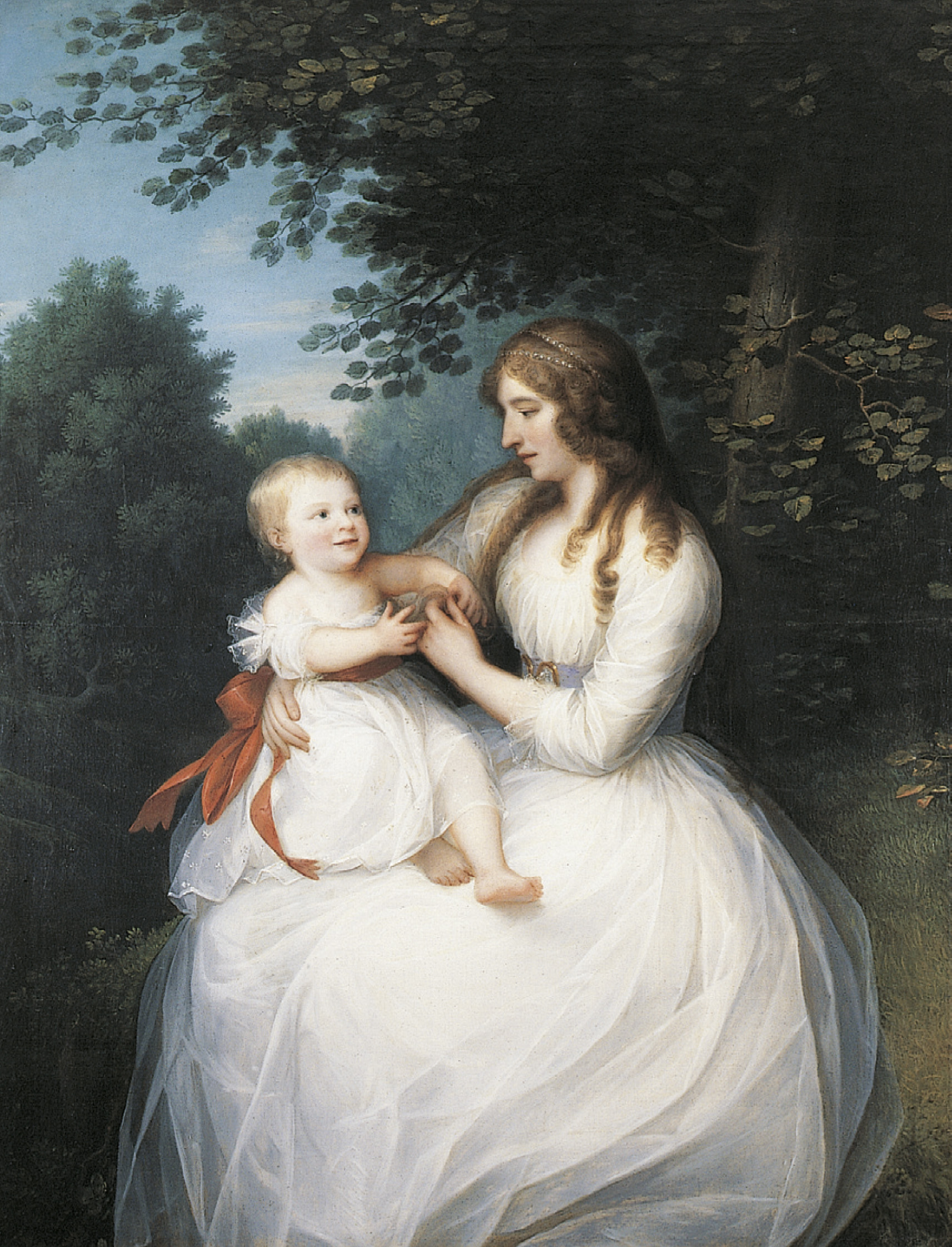
Friederike Brun with daughter Charlotte, painting by Erik Pauelsen (1780)

In 1799, Antvorskov Hovedgård was acquired by Constantin Brun. He imported several families from Switzerland and established a production of Swiss cheese primarily for overseas export. He also promoted innovative agricultural machinery, including chopping and threshing machines. Bruun was married to Friederike Brun, a leading salonist of her time.

Bruun created four small estates from part of the land that had previously belonged to Antvorskov Hovedgård, naming them Charlottendal, Augustendal, Idagaard and Karlsgaard, of which the latter four were named after his children. The four new manors were sold to Adam Wilhelm Hauch and Marcus Frederik Voigt in 1806. Charlottendal was sold to Frederik Nielsen Bøgvad (1741–1821) in 1809.

=== Frisch family, 1810–1847 ===
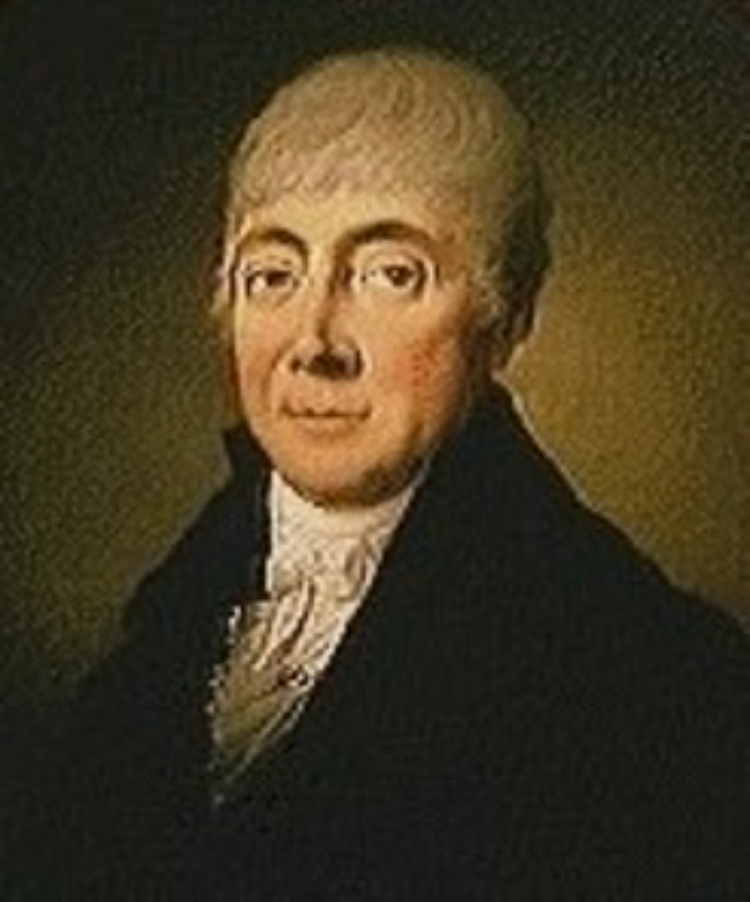
Hartvig Frisch

In 1810, Charlottendal was acquired by Hartvig Frisch, director of the Royal Greenland Trading Department. He also owned of the Frisch House at Nytorv 5 in Copenhagen and of Vodroffgård outside the city. In 1815 he purchased Augustendal as well.

Following Frisch's death, Charlottendal and Augustendal were passed down to his sons Frederik Emil and Constantin Frisch. In 1823, Constantin Frisch bought his brother's share of the estates. He merged them into a single estate under the name Charlottendal.

=== Neergaard family ===
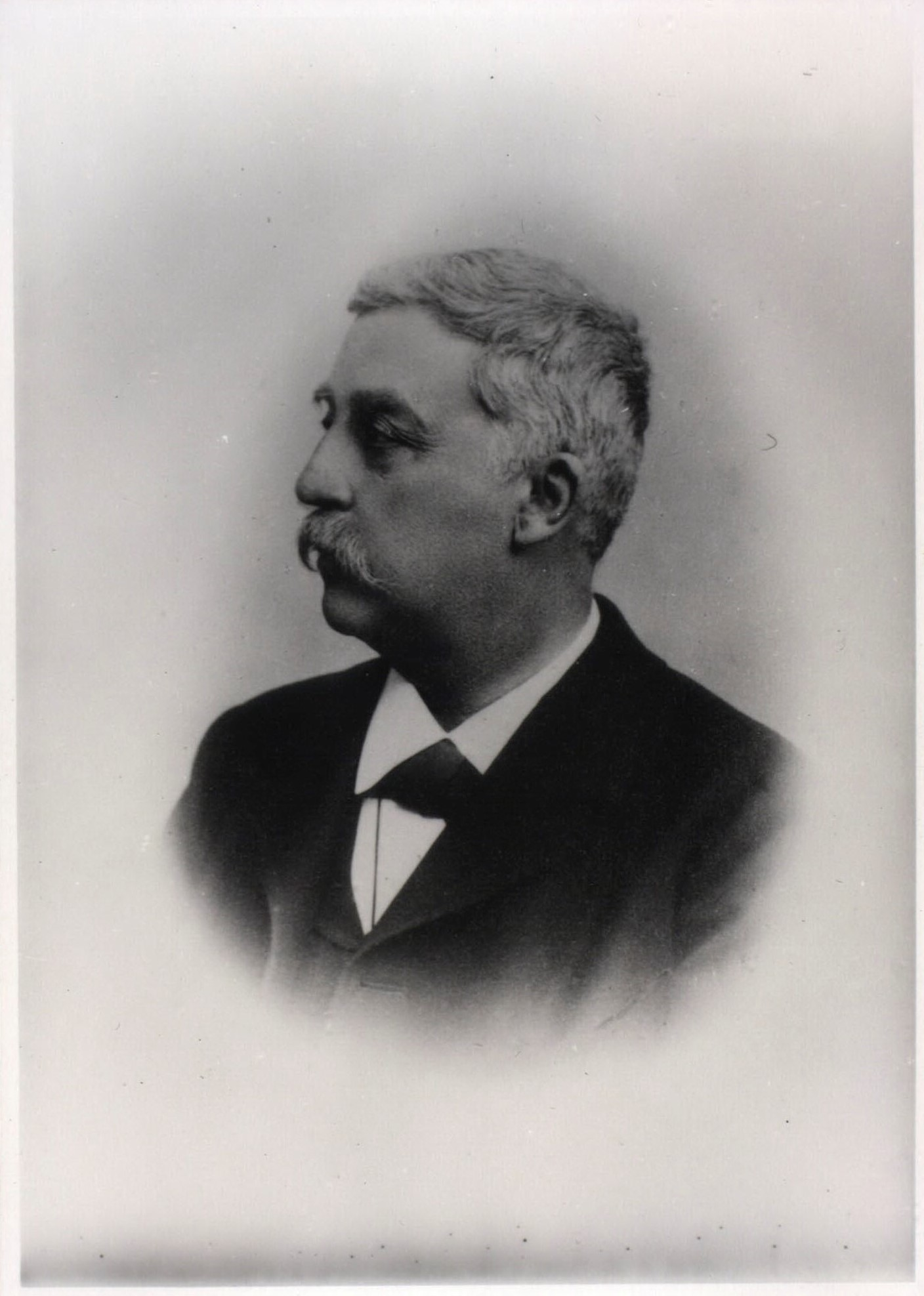
Charles Adolph Denis de Neergaard

In 1847, Constantin Frisch sold Charlottendal to Carl de Neergaard. He was already the owner of Gunderslevholm and Kastrupgård.

Carl de Neergaard died without children on 2 August 1850. His eldest brother's children drew lots for his estates with Kastrup and Charlottendal going to Charles Adolf Denis de Neergaard. He constructed the current main building of the Charlottendal estate. In 1862, Neergaard also purchased Gyldenholm Manor. The author and educator Zakarias Nielsen wrote his first poetry while working as a tutor on Charlottendal in 1863–1864.

On Charles Adolph Denis de Neergaard's death in 1903, Gyldenholm and Kastrupgård passed to his eldest son Carl. In 1908, Charlottendal was ceded to the younger brother Viggo de Neergaard. He had recently also purchased nearby Valdemarskilde. In 1920, he also purchased Lille Frederikslund. He was married two times, first to Karen Blixen's sister Inger Benedicte Dinesen and later to Elisabeth Lina Perrochet. He was a stakeholder and board member of Blixen's Karen Coffee Company Ltd.

In 1963, D. F. de Neergaard had to sell Charlottendal to the Danish state in connection with the establishment of Antvorskov Barracks. 230 hectares (570 acres) of land on the west side of the main road (formerly Augustendal) were sold to Idagaard, while Idagaardsfonden ceded approximately 50 hectares (120 acres) of woodland to Neergaard's Valdemarskilde as part of the transaction.

== Architecture ==
The main building is a one-storey brick building with a gabled median risalit and a red tile roof. It is flanked by two detached secondary wings.

== Surroundings ==
The garden is located to the west of the main building. The estate comprises a number of smaller woodlands, including Slagelse Lystskov, Karlsgaard skov, Nykobbel, Kalven and Charlottendal skov. Two lakes, Grønsø and Rørsø, are located in Charlottendal Skov. A larger lake known as Ny Sø, which was the site of a watermill, has been reclaimed.

== List of owners ==
- (1799–1806) Constantin Brun
- (1806–1808) Adam Wilhelm Hauch
- (1806–1808) Marcus Frederik Voigt
- (1808–1810) Frederik Nielsen Bøgvad
- (1810–1817) Hartvig Frisch
- (1817–1823) Frederik Emil Frisch
- (1817–1847) Constantin Frisch
- (1847–1850) Carl de Neergaard
- (1850–1903) Charles Adolph Denis de Neergaard
- (1908– ) Viggo de Neergaard
- (1969– ) Antvorskov Barracks
