= Idagaard =

Danish manor house, completed 1880

- Interactive map of the Idagaard area

General information
- Location: Idagårds Allé 10, Slagelse, Denmark
- Coordinates: 55°23′11″N 11°21′09″E
- Completed: 1880

Idagaard is a manor house and estate located immediately south of Slagelse, Denmark. The estate was created by the businessman Constantin Brun from land that had previously belonged to Antvorskov and is named after his daughter Ida Brun. It is now owned by the Idagaard Foundation.

== History ==
=== Early owners, 1797–1810 ===
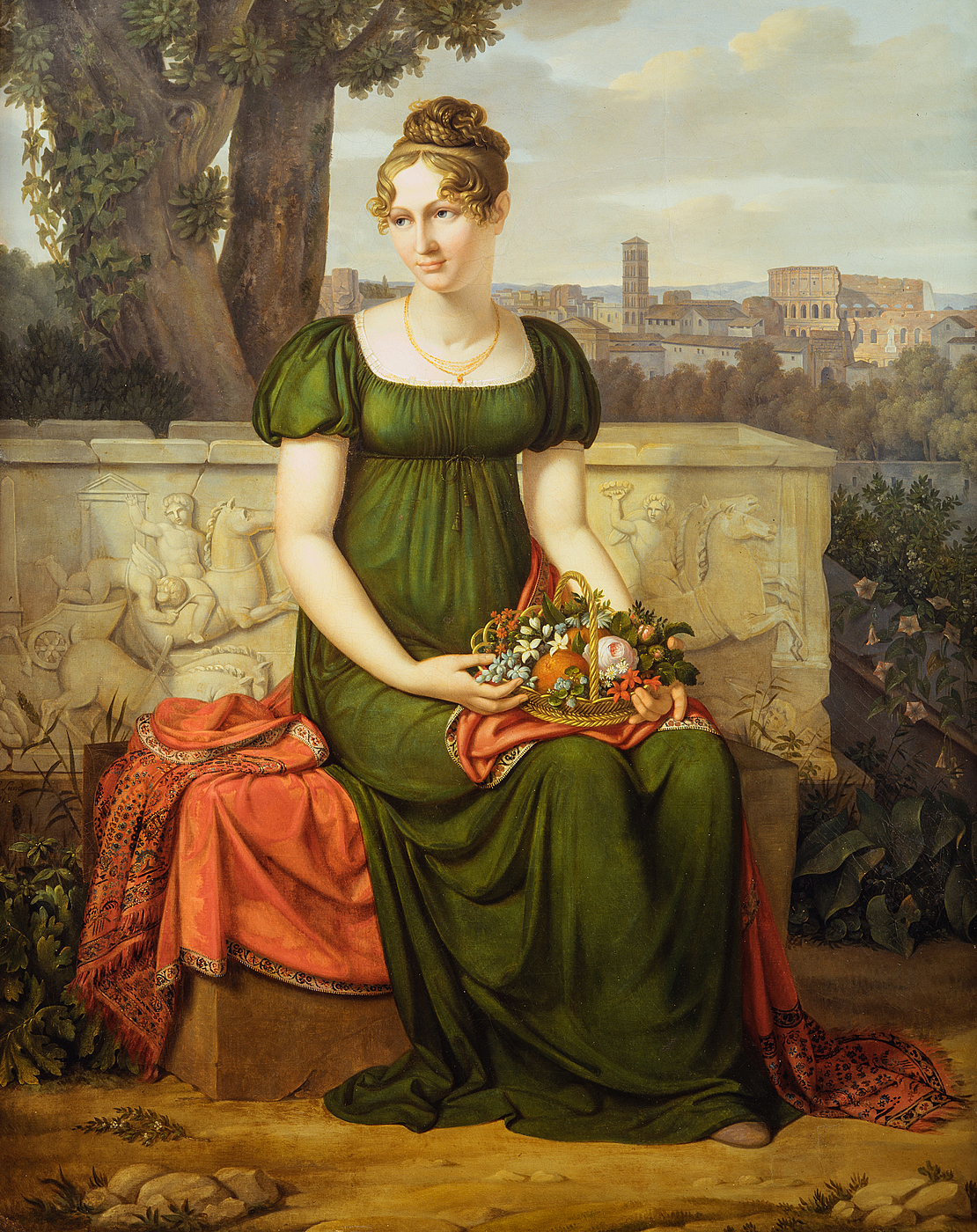
Portrait of Ida Brun, by J. L. Lund (1811)

Antvorskov Hovedgård and nearby Galensteen were acquired in 1799 by Constantin Brun. He imported several families from Switzerland and established a production of Swiss cheese which was mainly exported to overseas markets. He also modernized the management with the introduction of chopping and threshing machines. Bruun was married to Friederike Brun, a leading salonist of her time. Bruun created four small estates from part of the land that had previously belonged to Antvorskov Hovedgård, naming them Idagaard, Charlottendal, Augustendal and Karlsgaard after his children. Idagaard was thus named after his daughter Ida Bruun.

=== Changing owners, 1806–1018 ===
In 1806 Bruun sold all the estates to Adam Wilhelm Hauch and Marcus Frederik Voigt. They immediately began to sell them to different buyers. Idagaard was acquired by Ole Rasmussen Schou. In the 1830s, it was acquired by L. Trolle. The next owners was William Courtonne Mourier)1806–1896), whose father, Charles Adolph Denys Mourier, owned Hindemae on Gunen. His grandfather, Pierre Paul Ferdinand Mourier, who had made a fortune in the service of the Danish Asiatic Company, had owned Aaagaard at Kalundborg. Mourier sold Idagaard to L. T. Schultz. In 1878, Schultz sold Idagaard to S. Spandet.

=== Hvid and the Idagaard Foundation ===
In 1918, Idagaard was acquired by Jens Hvidberg. He and his wife owned the estate for more than 30 years. In 1941, they established the Idagaard Foundation.

In 1963, Idagaard acquired 220 tønder (barrels) of land from Charlottendal. Charlottendal had been expropriated by the Danish state in conjunction with the establishment of Antvorskov Barracks. Charlottendal's former owner, D. F. de Neergaard, who also owned Valdemarskilde, acquired 100 tønder of forest from Idagaard as part of the arrangement. Much of the original Idagaard estate waslater sold off for urban redevelopment. Most of the land that remains is therefore the land that previously belonged to Charlottendal (and before that to Augustadal).

== Architecture ==
The main building is from 1880. It is a single-storey, white-plastered building with a half-hipped roof clad in red tile.

== Today ==
Idagaard is one of four estates owned by the Idagaard Foundation. The three others are Lerchenfeld in Vedbynørre (acquired in 2013), Saxbroholm (acquired in 2016) and Skelbækgården (acquired 2019). The land is managed by the owner of Svendsholm.

== List of owners ==
- (1799–1806) Constantin Brun
- (1806– ) Adam Wilhelm Hauch
- (1806– ) Marcus Frederik Voigt
- ( –1835) Ole Rasmussen Schou
- (1835– ) L. Trolle
- ( – ) William C. Mourier
- ( –1878) L. T. Schultz
- (1878– ) S. Spandet
- ( –1918) E. V. J. Spandet née Neergaard
- (1918–1941) Jens Hvidberg
- (1941– ) Idagaard Foundation
