= Moltke Mansion =

Historic house in Copenhagen (Denmark)

Moltke's Mansion
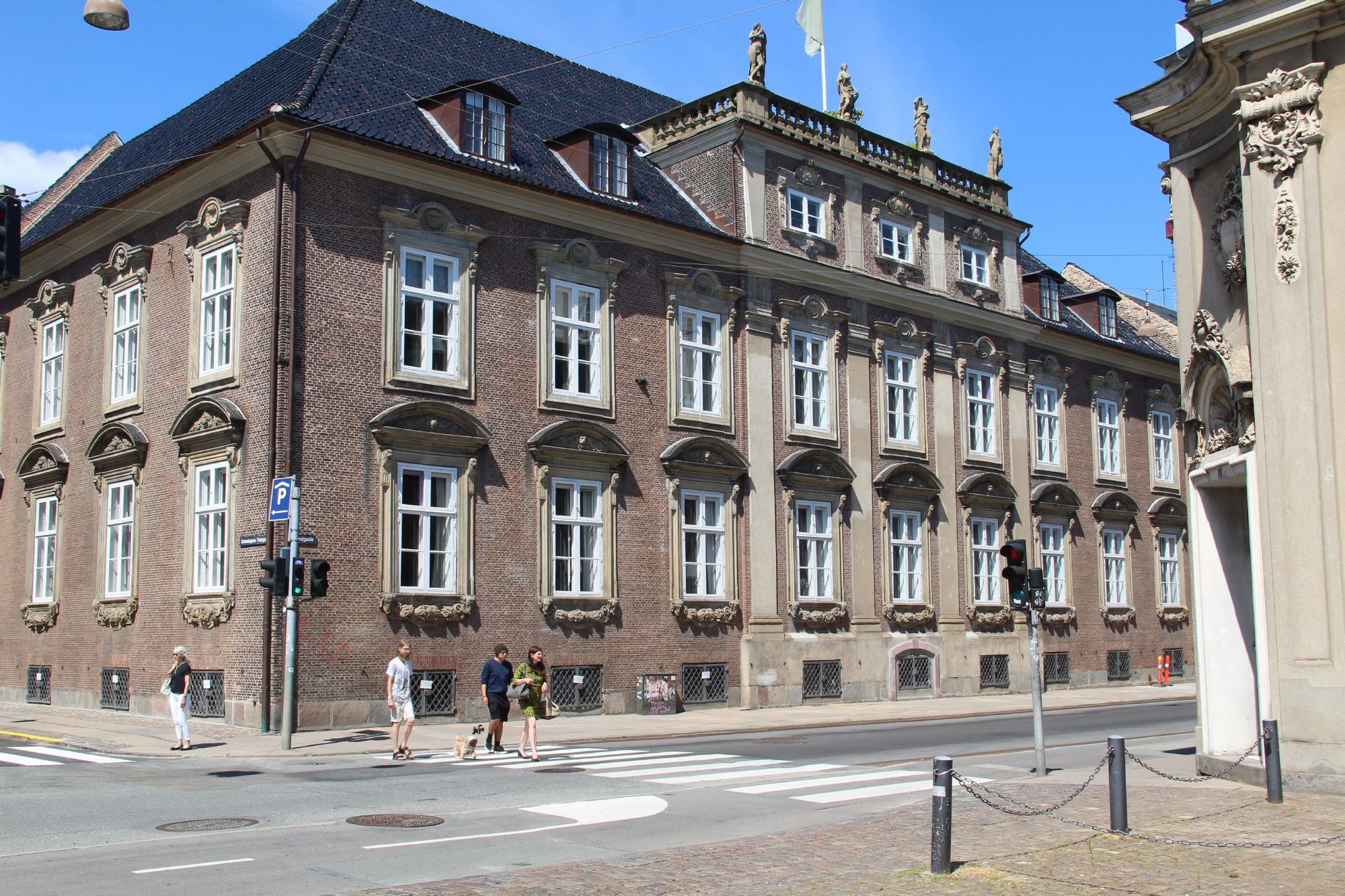
- Moltke's Mansion
- Interactive map of the Moltke's Mansion area

General information
- Architectural style: Baroque
- Location: Frederiksstaden, Copenhagen, Denmark
- Coordinates: 55.6833°N 12.5892°E
- Construction started: 1700
- Completed: 1702
- Client: Ulrik Frederik Gyldenløve
- Owner: Association of Craftsmen in Copenhagen

Design and construction
- Architect: Ernst Brandenburger

The Moltke's Mansion is a town mansion on the corner of Bredgade and Dronningens Tværgade in Copenhagen, Denmark. It is one of several town mansions in Frederiksstaden, although it actually predates the neighbourhood by half a century. It was built for Ulrik Frederik Gyldenløve between 1700 and 1702 and was originally known as Gyldenløve's Little Mansion (in contrast to his larger mansion, now known as Charlottenborg Palace, at Kongens Nytorv). It received its current name in 1842, after it was acquired by Adam Wilhelm Moltke, the first Danish Prime Minister under the Danish constitutional monarchy.

The Baroque mansion has rich sandstone decorations featuring elephants and lion heads and is also notable for its interior decorations by Erik Pauelsen.

== History ==
=== Gyldenløve's Little Mansion ===
A house was built on the site in the 1680s by Jørgen Henriksen Gosebuch. It was acquired by Ulrik Frederik Gyldenløve, the illegitimate son of King Frederick III, who demolished it and had a new mansion built in its place. Built by Ernst Brandenburger from 1700 to 1702, it became colloquially known as "Gyldenløve's little mansion" as opposed to "Gyldenløve's large mansion", later known as Charlottenborg Palace, at Kongens Nytorv. The house was located in New Copenhagen, the area which had been incorporated into the fortified city when the East Rampart was straightened in 1647, but in a marshy area which had still seen little redevelopment. Sophie Amalienborg, a royal pavilion for entertainment, had been located close by but it burned down in 1689, although it was re-built to a smaller design around the same time as Gyldenløve completed his mansion.

=== Danneskiold-Laurvig era ===
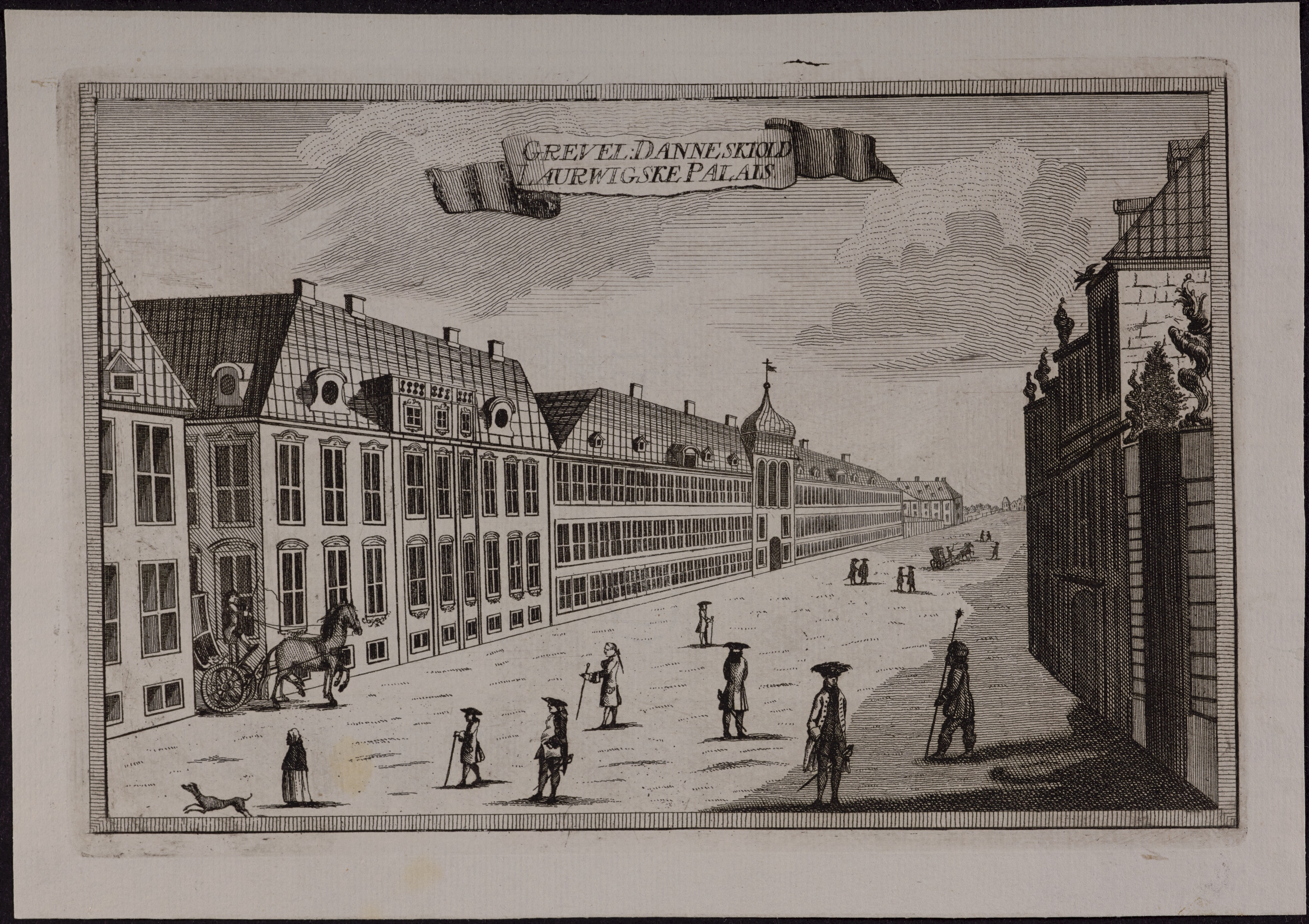
Count Danneskiold-Laurvig's mansion in c. 1750

Upon Gyldenløve's death in 1704, the property was passed on to his son, Count Ferdinand Anton Danneskiold-Laurvig, who owned it until his death in 1754. Under his ownership, the mansion was altered between 1716 and 1723 by Johan Cornelius Krieger. When Frederiksstaden was founded a few years prior to Danneskiold-Laurvig's death, a number of mansions were built in the area, particularly along Bredgade, one of the new district's main arteries, gradually urbanizing the environs.

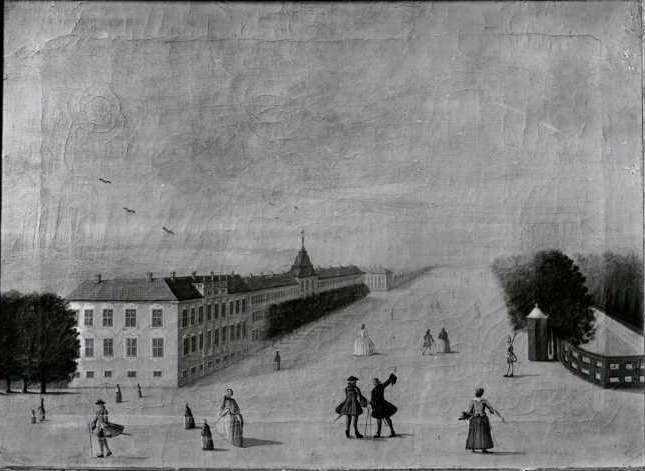
Count Danneskiold-Laurvig's mansion in c. 1750

The next owner was Frederik Ludvig Danneskiold-Laurvig, Danneskiold-Laurvig's oldest son, but after his death in 1762 his widow sold the house to his brother.

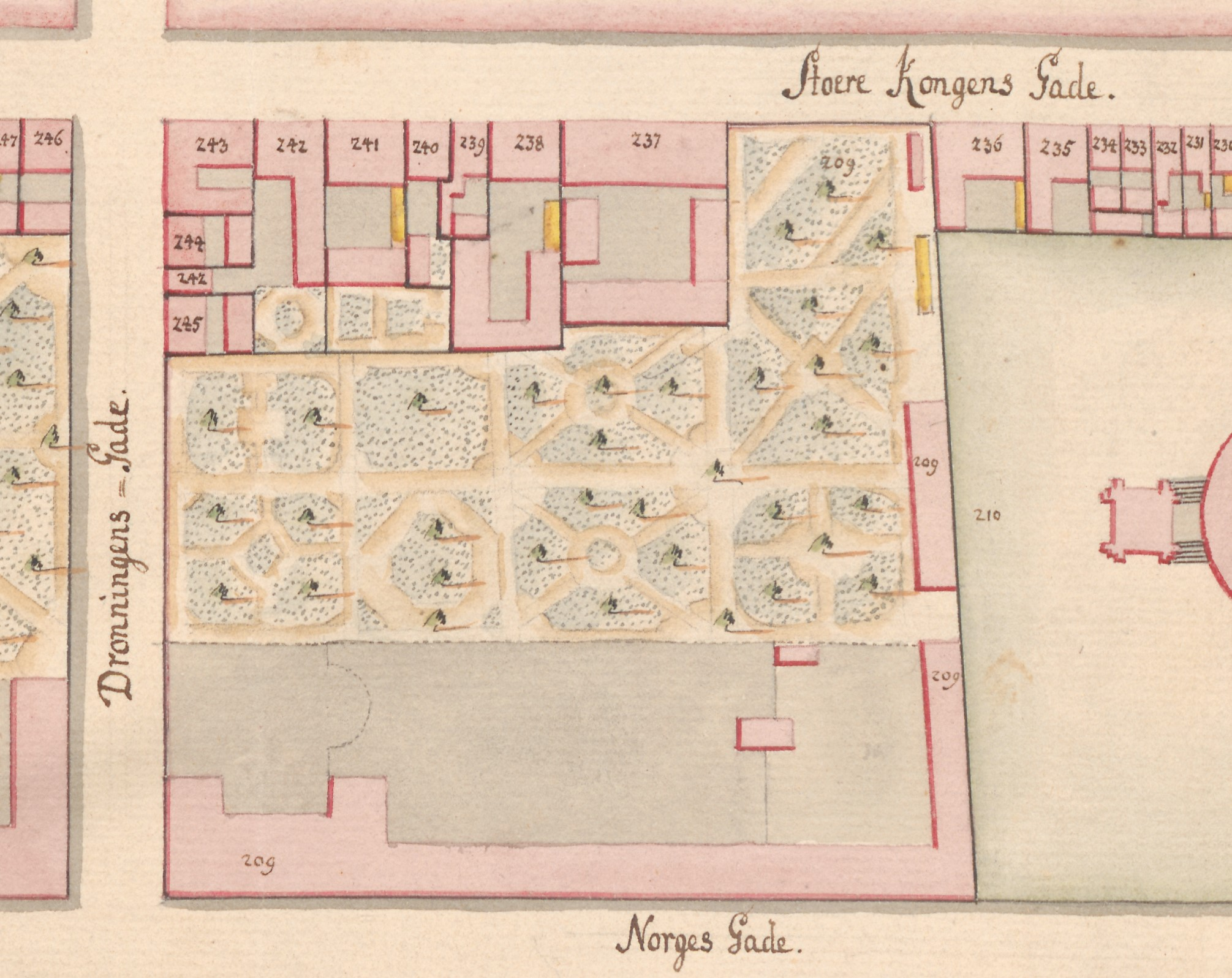
No. 209 seen in a detail from Christian Gedde's map of St. Ann's East Quarter, 1757

The mansion then became the focal point of a minor scandal when the brother, Count Christian Conrad Danneskiold-Laurvigen, abducted a young actress, Mette Marie Rose, whom he had fallen for, and hid her in the house. Whether it was because the girl or her father disapproved of the liaison remains unclear, but King Frederick V was infuriated by the affair. Danneskiold-Laurvigen was sent exiled to his fief in Norway and had to pay a penalty of 10,000 Danish rigsdaler to a noble cause plus an annual compensation to the girl.

=== Residence of a merchant and a queen ===
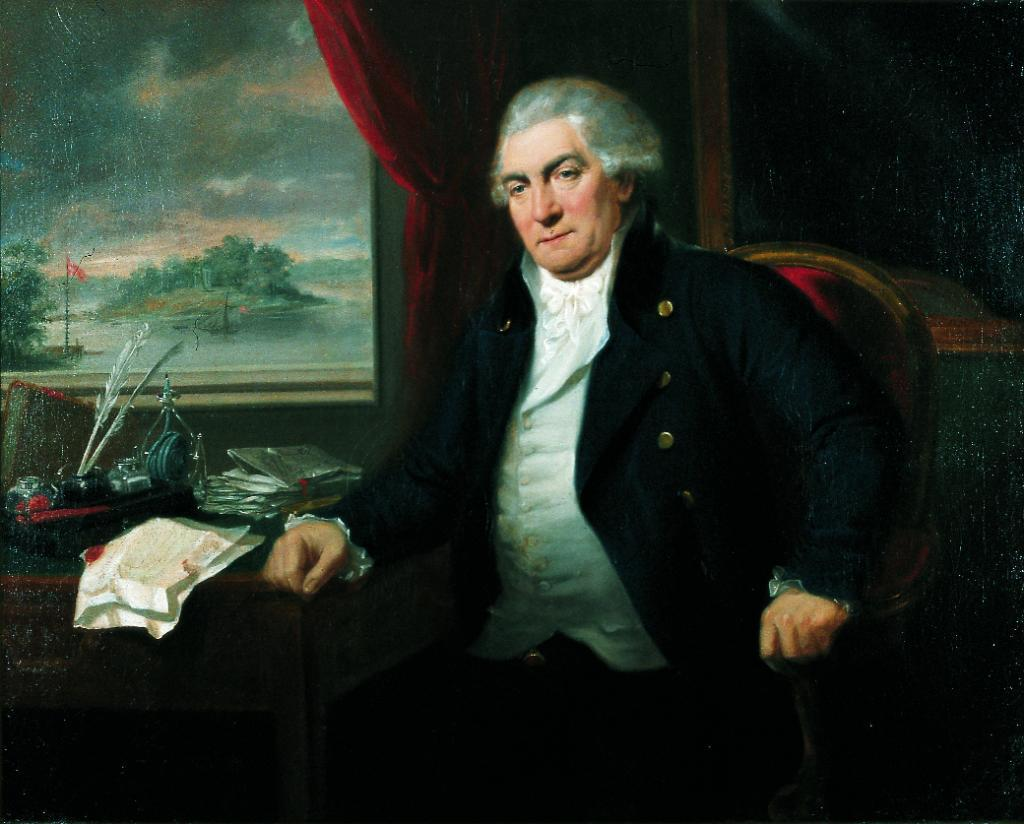
Frédéric de Coninck painted by Daniel Orme in 1799

When Conrad Danneskiold-Laurvigen died in Norway in 1783, the mansion was acquired by Frédéric de Coninck and Niels Lunde Reiersen, two affluent business partners who had created a large trading company with a fleet of 70 ships. De Coninck, who lived in the mansion from 1784 to 1793, carried out costly alterations of the interiors.

After the Fire of Christiansborg Palace in 1794 the royal family was left homeless. While the rest of the family took up residence in Amalienborg Palace, until then four aristocratic mansions, Dowager Queen Juliana Maria, widow of King Frederick V, bought de Coninck's mansion in Bredgade and lived there until her death two years later.

=== Golden Age venue ===
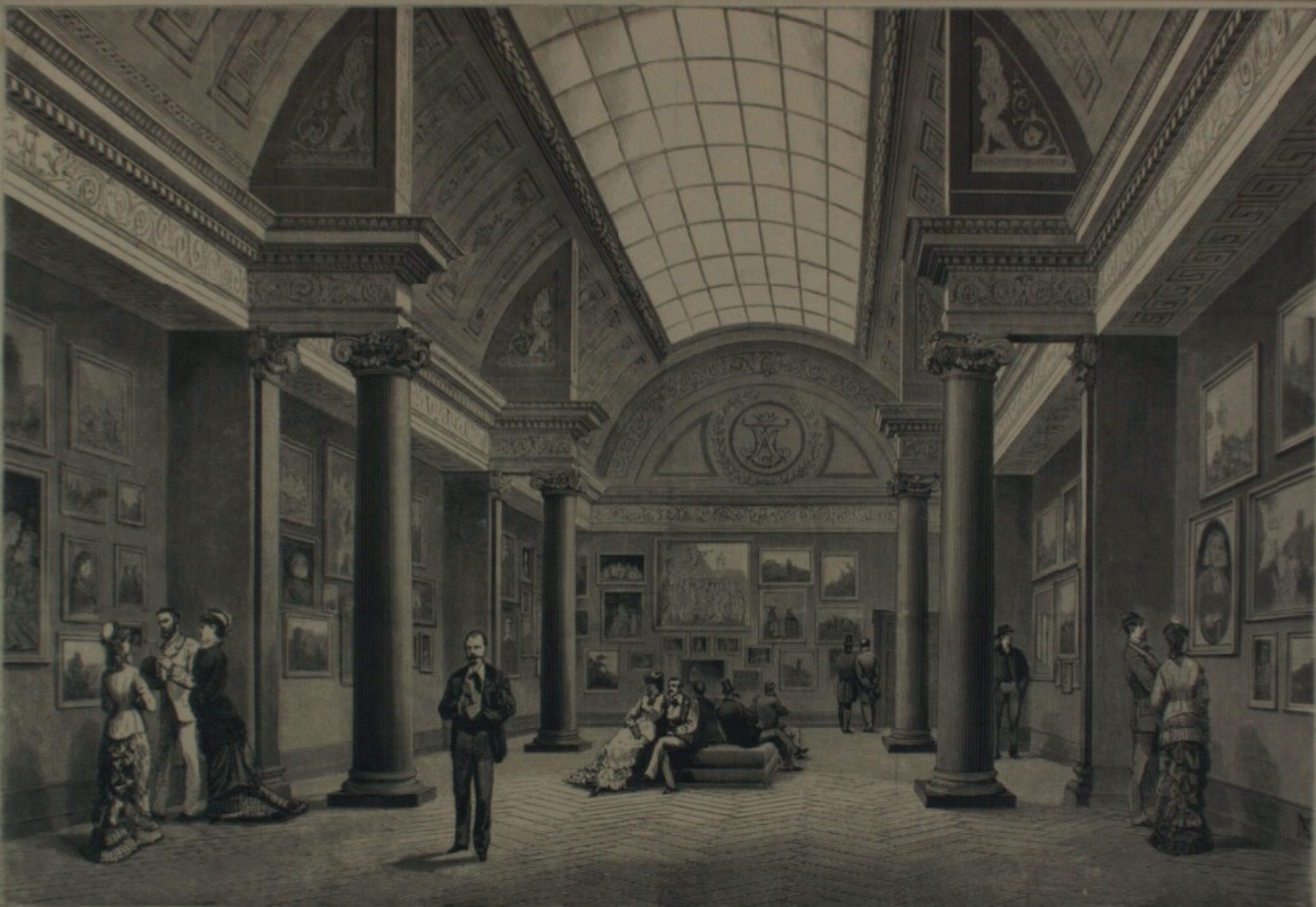
Moltke's Painting Collection drawing by C. V. Nielsen

After the dowager queen's death, the mansion was acquired by another affluent merchant, Constantin Brun, a German trader who had become royal administrator of trade in the Danish West Indies and was also building a successful private trading empire. His wife was the writer and salonist Friederike Brun who had a large international network which included prominent names such as Johann Wolfgang von Goethe, Friedrich Schiller, August Wilhelm Schlegel, Johann Gottfried Herder, Wilhelm Grimm, Bertel Thorvaldsen, and the Swiss writer Madame de Staël with whom she formed a close friendship. Her literary salons mainly took place at Sophienholm during the summer season but in winter time at the mansion in Bredgade. Among the Danish artists who regularly attended her salons were Jens Baggesen, Adam Oehlenschläger, Johanne Luise Heiberg, C.E.F Weyse, B. S. Ingemann and Kamma Rahbek.

In 1836, after the Bruns died within a few months of each other, the mansion was purchased by Heinrich Lütthans who was a lieutenant-colonel in the Civic Guard. He was bourgeois through and through, but nevertheless continued the tradition of playing host to aristocrats. Their home also exerted a special pull on young students from the nearby Regensen dormitory due to the family's five pretty daughters. Regular guests included the poet Christian Winther, who eventually married the oldest daughter of the house, Julie, after repeated complications.

=== Moltke era ===
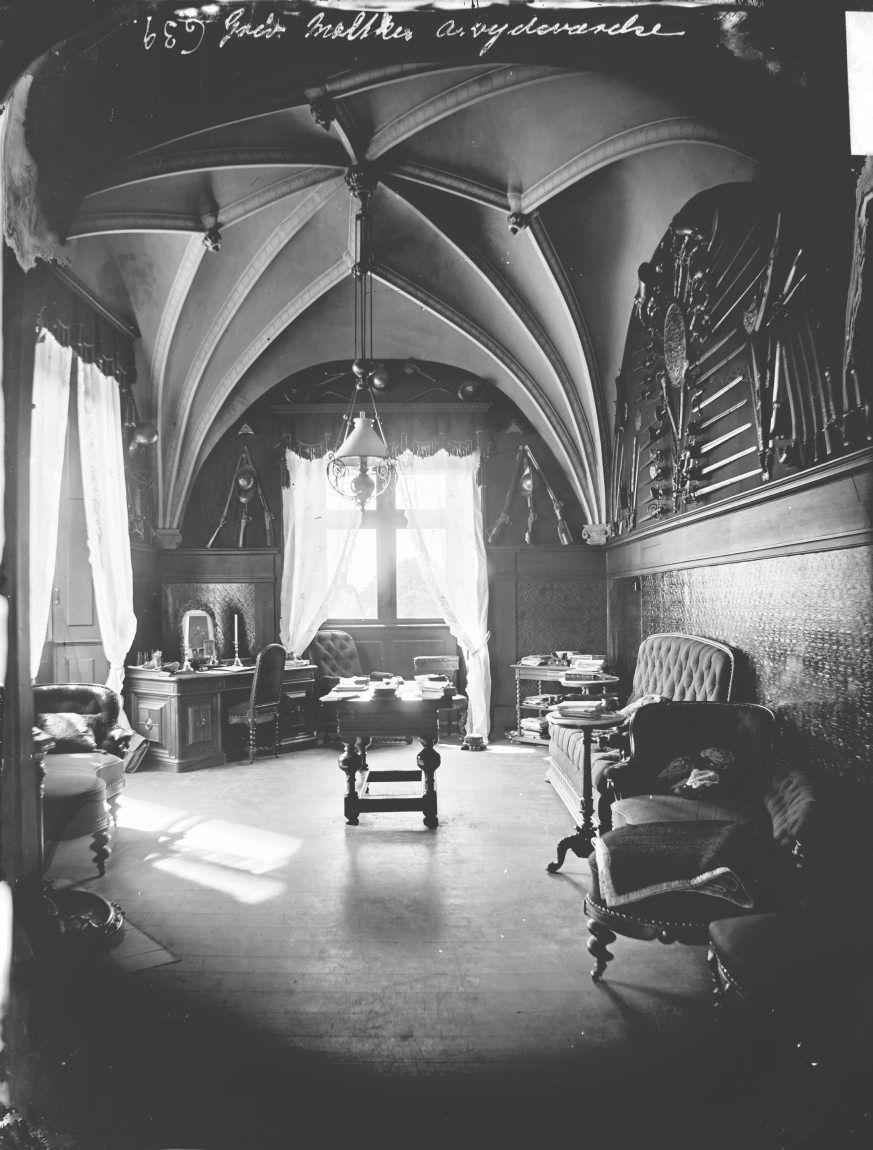
Count Moltke's study photographed by Frederik Riise

Adam Wilhelm Moltke was already residing in the mansion at the time of the 1840 census. He lived there with his wifeMarie Elisabeth Moltke. their five children (aged two to 15), the tutors Otto Mandrup Schjøtz and Christian Henrich Brasch, the retired turner Andreas Lund, a cook, a coachman, a caretaker, four male servants, a governess, a female cook, a seamstress and six maids.

Moltke purchased the mansion in 1852. He had served as Prime Minister of Denmark from 1848 to 1852, was now a member of the Landstinget as well as a large landowner. His family had lacked a suitable home in the city after ceding their previous mansion, one of the four Amalienborg mansions, to the royal family. Their old residence had been known as Moltke's Mansion and this name was transferred to their new property. After the harvests at Bregentved Manor and other family holdings, he would move his entire household to Copenhagen.

From 1878 to 1880 the mansion was extended with seven bays along Dronningens Tværgade by the architect Theodor Zeltner. On the top storey, a skylit gallery was built for Moltke's extensive and valuable art collection. The collection was opened to the public.

Over the next generations, the mansion stayed in the Moltke family but with advances in infrastructure and technology the need for a Copenhagen home became less evident. In the 1920s, the journey from Bregentved to Copenhagen, which had previously taken two days by carriage, could be made in less than two hours, and business could often be handled by telephone.

The Moltkes therefore decided to dispose of Moltke's Mansion and in 1930 it was sold to the Craftsmen's Guild in Copenhagen.

=== Craftsmen’s Guild of Copenhagen ===
One year after acquiring Moltke's Mansion, the guild also purchased the neighbouring property, at 41 Bredgade, which was also owned by the Moltkes, and embarked on another expansion of the old property, building a new wing with an assembly hall.

== Architecture ==
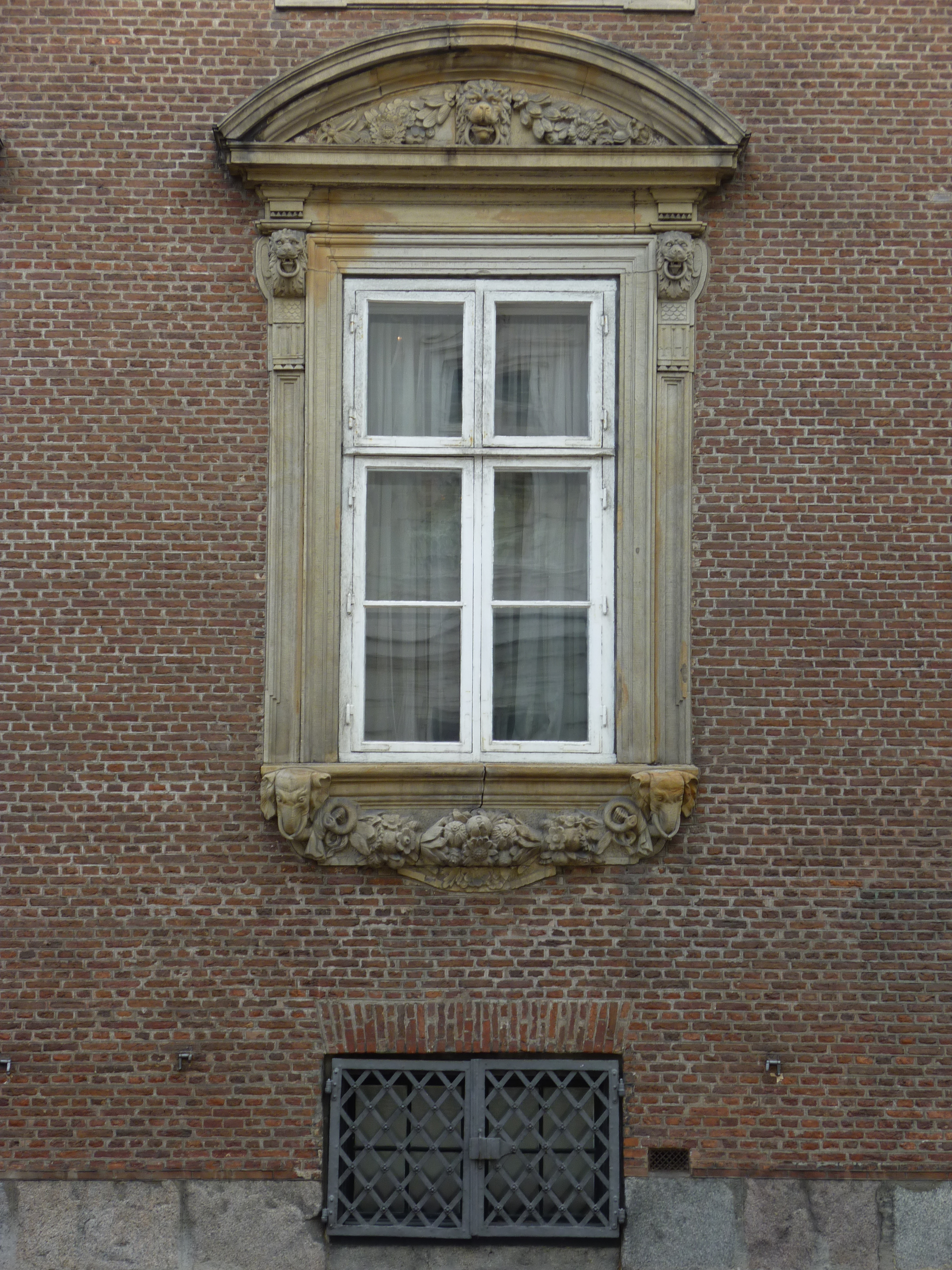
Window detail

The mansion is built in the Baroque style and consists of two floors and a cellar. The main facade on Bredgade is nine bays long with giant pilasters in the centre. The side on Dronningens Tværgade was originally considerably shorter but was extended by seven bays at the end of the 19th century in a style matching the rest of the building.

The rich sandstone decorations, with elephants, lion's heads and flowering vines, and the balustrade with sculptures date from Krieger's alterations.

== Interior ==
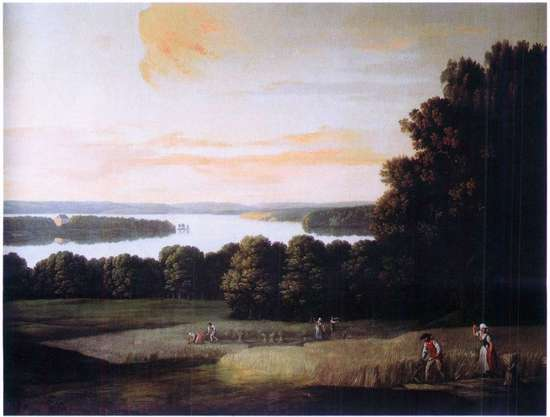
One of Erik Pauelsen's overdoors, depicting a harvest scene from the Dronninggård estate

The mansion contains the Dronninggaard Salon which was decorated by the artist Erik Pauelsen during the period when Frédéric de Coninck lived there. It takes its name from Dronninggård, his country house at Furesøen Lake north of Copenhagen. Pauelsen's decorations include two large murals and three overdoors as well as views and topographical paintings from the house's idyllic setting.

The Dronninggaard Chambers is located on the first floor of the palace with windows facing Bredgade, adjoining the Green Chambers and across from the Large Assembly Hall. The adjoining Green Room is decorated with Erik Paulsen's paintings of the Hermitage Lodge and the Sound.

The Golden Hall is decorated with murals by Bjørn Nørgaard presenting the history of craftsmanship.

== Moltke's Mansion today ==
Moltke's Mansion is still owned by the Association of Craftsmen in Copenhagen. It is used as a venue for banquets, meetings and small conferences.

== Restaurant AOC ==
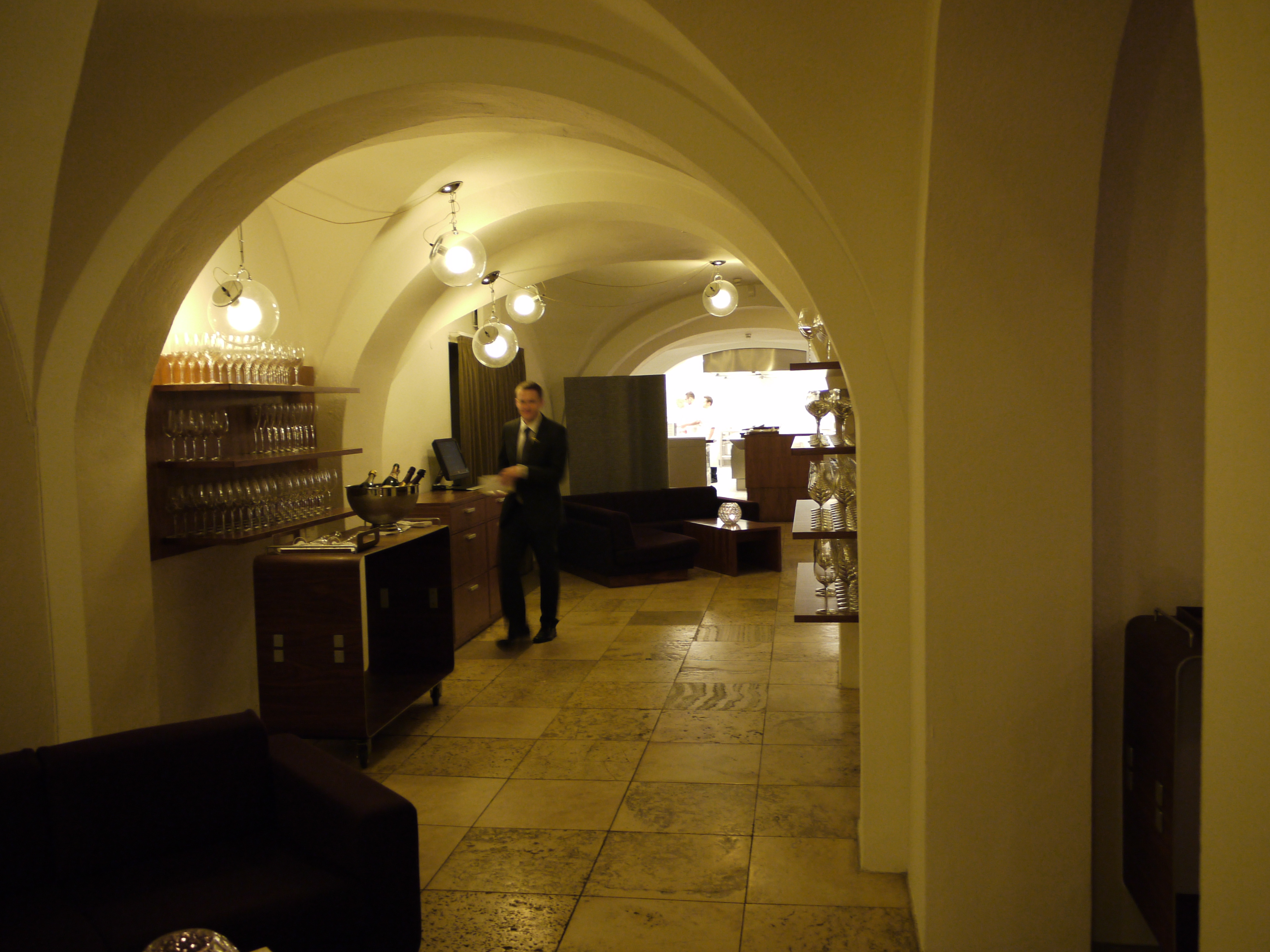
Restaurant AOC

The cellar houses the 2-Michelin-starred Restaurant AOC. The restaurant is owned by the sommelier Christian Aarø and received its first star in 2012 with Ronny Emborg as head chef. He left AOC in 2013 to become head chef at Hotel D'Angleterre and was succeeded by Søren Selin who came from a position as head chef at Alberto K at Radisson Blu Royal Hotel.

== List of former owners ==
- 1680-1686 Jørgen Henrik Goesbruch
- 1686-1704 Ulrik Frederik Gyldenløve
- 1704-1754 Ferdinand Anton Danneskiold-Laurvig
- 1754-1762 Frederik Ludvig Danneskiold-Laurvig
- 1762-1763 Anna Joachimine Ahlefeldt gift Danneskiold-Laurvig
- 1763-1783 Christian Conrad Danneskiold-Laurvig
- 1783-1788 Niels Lunde Reiersen / Frédéric de Coninck
- 1788-1794 Frédéric de Coninck
- 1794-1796 Juliana Maria of Brunswick-Wolfenbüttel
- 1796-1836 Constantin Brun
- 1836-1852 J. Heinrich Lütthans
- 1852-1860 Adam Wilhelm Moltke
- 1860-1875 Frederik Georg Julius Augustsen Moltke
- 1875-1930 Frederik Christian Frederiksen Moltke
- 1930- Association of Craftsmen in Copenhagen

== See also ==
- Christian VII's Palace, also known as Moltke's Palace
