= Gustav Anton von Seckendorff =

German author, actor and declaimer

Gustav Anton von Seckendorff (20 November 1775 – 1823) was a German author, actor and declaimer.

== Life ==
Gustav Anton Freiherr von Seckendorff was an offspring of the Gudent branch of the House of Seckendorff, which had its residence at Meuselwitz, Thuringia. Gustav Anton was born at Meuselwitz as the seventh child of Friedrich Carl von Seckendorff (1727-1799), a colonel in the service of the Duchy of Brunswick-Lüneburg. His brother Adolf Christian (1767-1833), who had a military career, also became known as a writer, and his works are sometimes confused with those of Gustav Anton.

After studies at the mining academy of Freiberg and the universities of Leipzig and Wittenberg, he visited the United States in 1796. During his stay in Philadelphia, Pennsylvania he married Maria Elisabeth (Betty) Lechler (1782-1858), with whom he was to have fourteen children. From Pennsylvania he reported to the Neue Teutsche Merkur on the abuse of poor German immigrants (redemptioners).

After his return to Germany in 1799 he entered state service in the Electorate of Saxony, occupying various positions before he was appointed Kammerdirektor in the duchy of Saxe-Hildburghausen (1807). A difference of opinion led to his resignation after seven months. He then decided to devote himself to an artistic and scholarly career. Using the stage name Patrik Peale, between 1808 and 1812 he toured the German speaking world performing as declaimer, mime artist, actor and lecturer, earning praise as well as strong criticism. His wife Betty assisted in some of his mimic or ‘mimoplastic’ productions.

In 1812 Seckendorff switched to an academic career. He obtained a doctorate in Göttingen, where he lectured as Privatdozent, and in 1814 was appointed Professor of Philosophy and Aesthetics at the University of Brunswick (Collegium Carolinum). He resigned this post in 1821, and went to the United States to establish himself as a book seller. He died in the summer of 1823 in Alexandria, Louisiana, reputedly “in poverty and misery”.

== Reputation ==
Seckendorff is mostly remembered for his Vorlesungen über Deklamation und Mimik (1816). Like many other declaimers and declamation theorists of the time, he believed that speech prosody is a kind of music. He attempted to demonstrate this in his stage declamation, in which he accompanied himself on the piano. Critics of his declamation style include the composer and author Johann Friedrich Reichardt and the actor and theater director August Klingemann.

== Selected works ==
- Otto III.: ein Trauerspiel in fünf Aufzügen (Torgau 1805)
- Kritik der Kunst (Göttingen 1812)
- Vorlesungen über die bildende Kunst des Alterthums und der neuern Zeit: mit Beiträgen zur Künstlerentwickelung (Aarau 1814)
- Orsina: Trauerspiel in fünf Aufzügen, als Folgestück auf Lessings Emilia Galotti (Braunschweig 1815)
- Vorlesungen über Deklamation und Mimik (Braunschweig 1816)
- Grundzüge der philosophischen Politik: ein Handbuch bei Vorträgen (Leipzig 1817)
