= Attitude (art) =

Posture or gesture given to a figure by a painter or sculptor

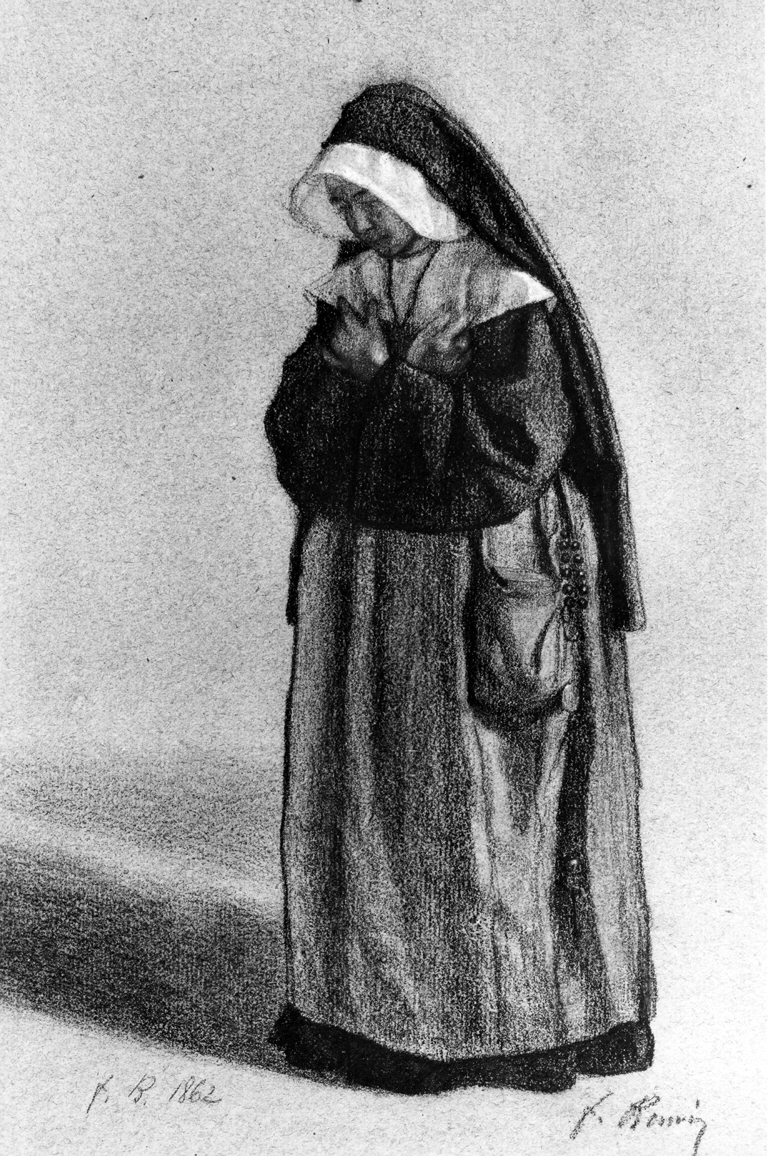
Nun Standing in Attitude of Prayer (1862), charcoal and pastel on paper, by François Bonvin

Emma, Lady Hamilton made the striking of attitudes into an art form, portraying classical themes such as the Judgement of Paris.

Attitude as a term of fine art refers to the posture or gesture given to a figure by a painter or sculptor. It applies to the body and not to a mental state, but the arrangement of the body is presumed to serve a communicative or expressive purpose. An example of a conventional attitude in art is proskynesis to indicate submissive respect toward God, emperors, clerics of high status, and religious icons; in Byzantine art, it is particularly characteristic in depictions of the emperor paying homage to Christ. In 20th- and 21st-century art history, "attitude" is used most often to label one of these conventional postures; another example is the orans pose.

"Attitude" was arguably more important as an aesthetic term in the 19th century, when it was defined in one art-related dictionary as

the posture or disposition of the limbs and members of a figure, by which we discover the action in which it is engaged, and the very sentiment supposed to be in the mind of the person represented. It comprehends all the motions of the body, and requires a perfect knowledge of ponderation, and whatever refers to the centre of gravity; but whatsoever attitude be given to any figure, that attitude must show the beautiful parts, as much as the subject will permit, let the subject be what it will. It must, besides, have such a turn as, without departing from probability, or from the character of the figure, may diffuse a beauty over the action. It is allowed that the choice of fine attitudes constitutes the greatest part of the beauties of grouping.

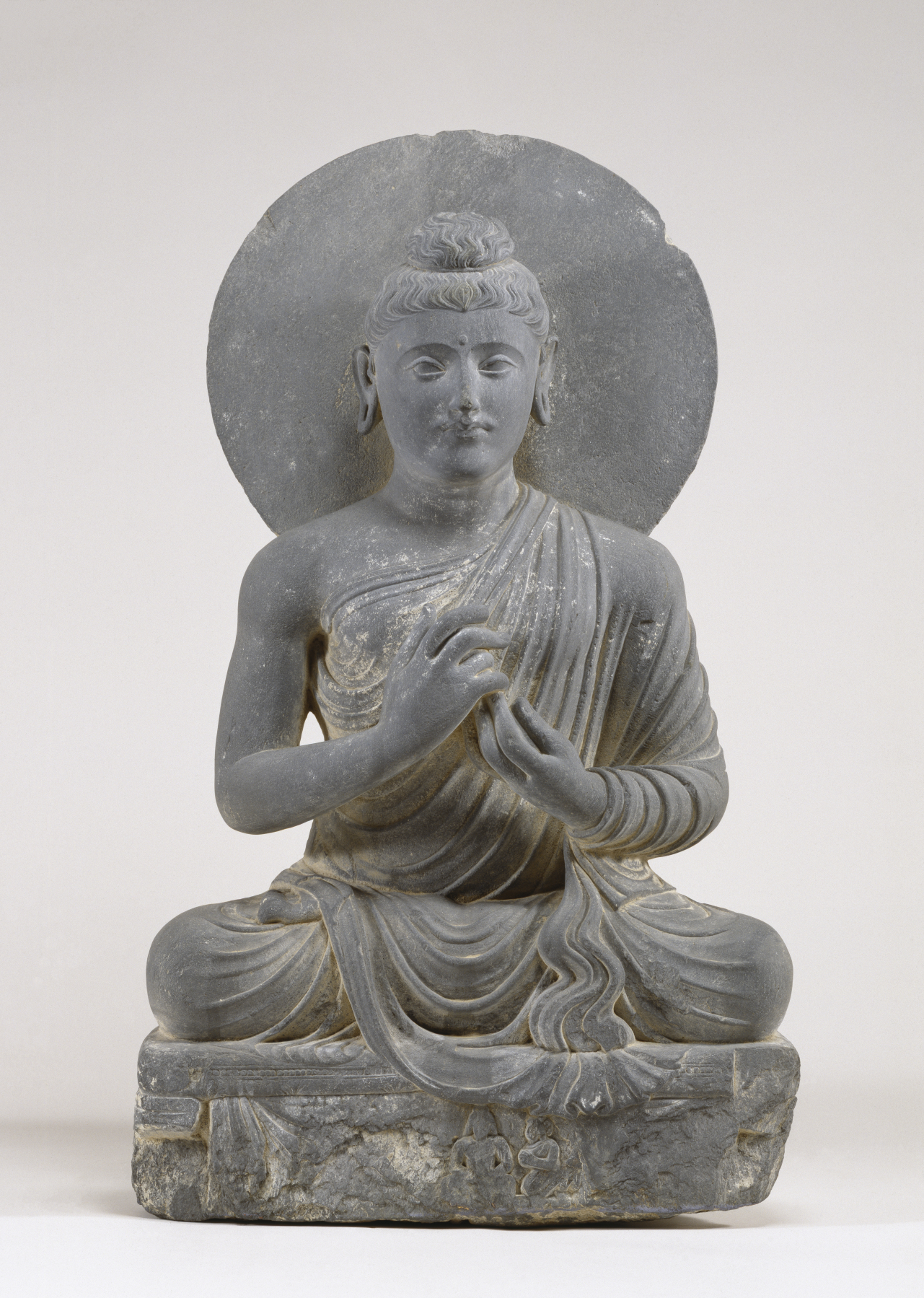
Seated Buddha in the Attitude of Preaching, 2nd-century Gandharan art: the hand gesture (mudra) indicates that the Buddha is delivering a sermon

== See also ==
- Attitude (ballet)
- Mimoplastic art
- Body language
- Composition (visual arts)
