= Erik Pauelsen =

Danish painter

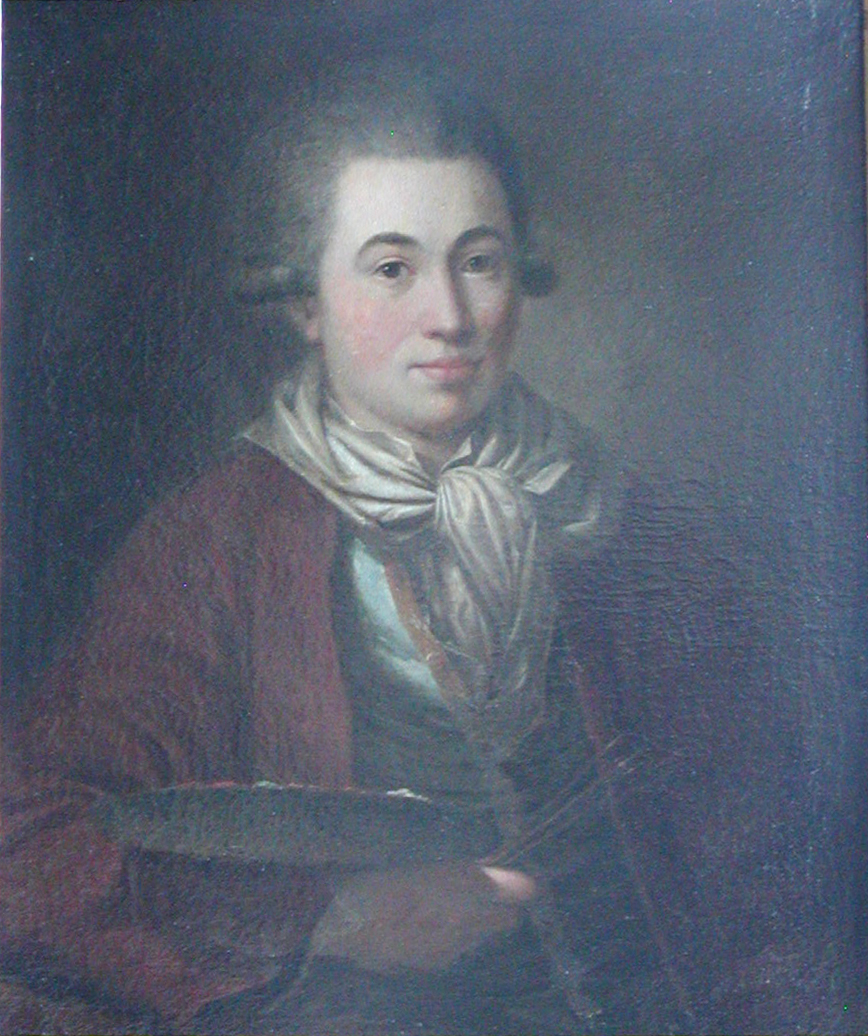
- Self-portrait by Erik Pauelsen
- Born: 2 or 14 October 1749; Østerbølle Parish, North Jutland Region
- Died: 20 February 1790 (aged 40); Copenhagen, Denmark
- Cause of death: Self-defenestration
- Education: Royal Danish Academy of Fine Arts
- Known for: Painting

Erik Pauelsen (2 or 14 October 1749 – 20 February 1790) was a Danish painter. He is most notable for his landscapes and was also a popular portraitist. However, he did not experience the same level of success as Jens Juel and Nicolai Abildgaard, his contemporaries, and in 1790 he committed suicide.

== Biography ==
Erik Pauelsen was born in Østerballe Parish in Himmerland some time between 2 and 14 October 1749. From an early age he had his mind set on becoming an artist. He travelled to Copenhagen and studied at the Royal Danish Academy of Fine Arts from 1770 to 1777 where he won the large silver medal and the small gold medal in 1775 and finally the large gold medal in 1777 together with the Academy's travel scholarship. He travelled to Rome by way of Hamburg, Düsseldorf and Paris and visited Dresden and Berlin on his way back. During his travels he became a member of several foreign art academies and was granted the title of professor in Düsseldorf.

After his return to Denmark, he became a member of the art academy but was passed over for the post of professor by Jens Juel in 1784 and then again for the position of painter to the royal court by Vigilius Eriksen. For Pauelsen this could only be explained as a result of intrigue, and he became more and more embittered.

He remained a popular portraitist and also enjoyed success as a landscape painter. From 1785 to 1786 he decorated a room in Frédéric de Coninck's mansion on Bredgade, now known as Moltke's Mansion after a later owner. The decorations, murals and overdoors, presented scenes from the environs of Dronningegård, de Coninck's country house north of Copenhagen. In 1788 he travelled to Norway and brought back a series of landscape paintings which were acquired by the royal painting collections. However, he suffered from his feeling belittled and defeated by his peers and in 1790 he committed suicide by jumping out of a window in his home.

Pauelsen is most notable for his landscapes. He visited Norway and painted Sarpsfossen (1789), now in the Danish National Gallery.

== Works ==
Among those whose portraits he painted were Johannes Ewald (c. 1780, Frederiksborg Museum), Søren Gyldendal and his wife (1780), and Friederike Brun with her daughter Ida Brun (1789).

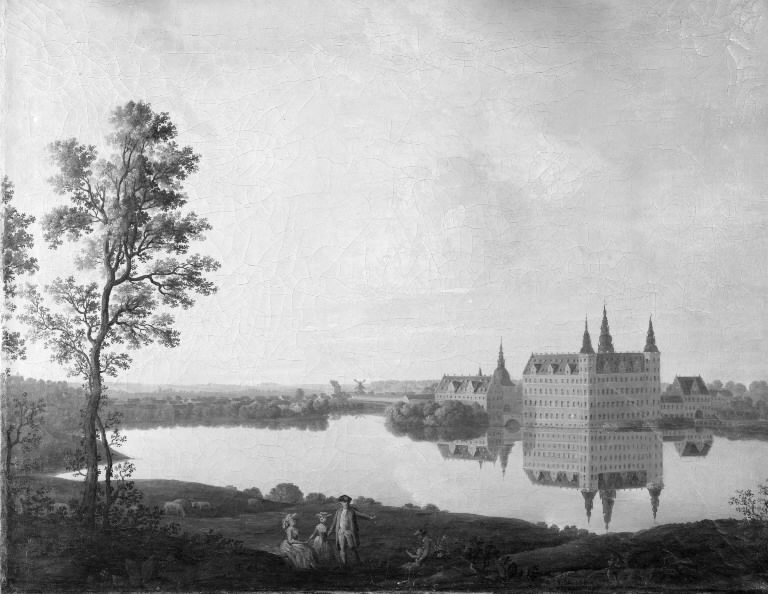
Frederiksborg Castle (1786)

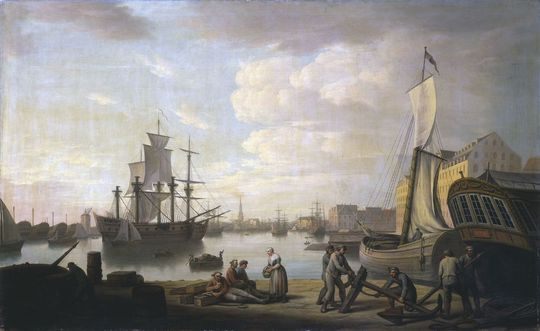
Port of Copenhagen viewed from Nordre Toldbod (1788)

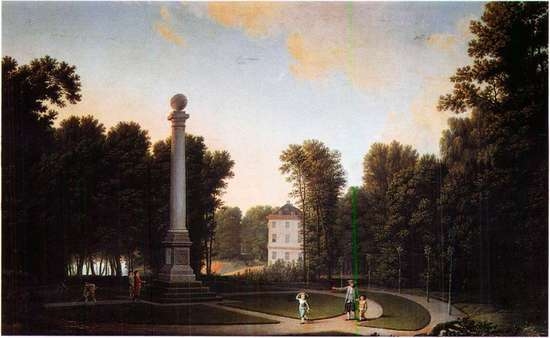
Dronninggård

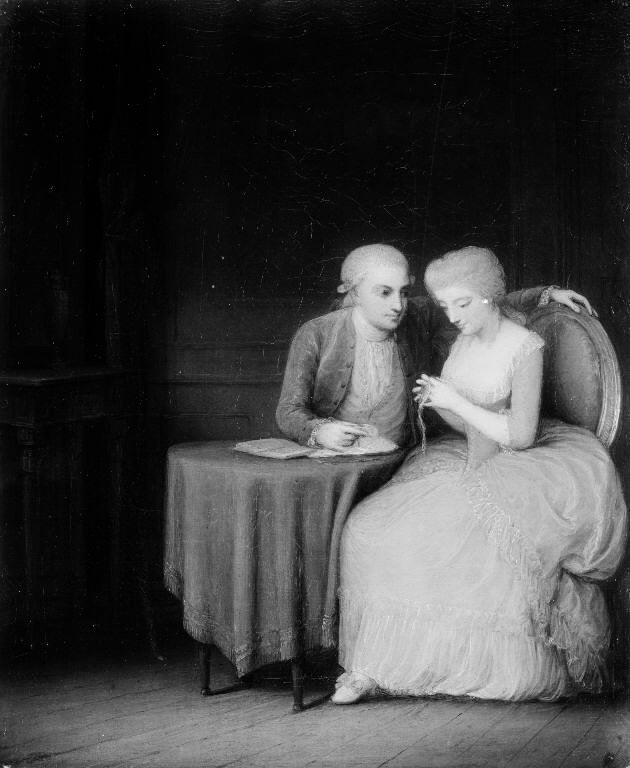
Frieren (1784)
