= Mimoplastic art =

Performance art genre depicting works of art by use of mime

Emma, Lady Hamilton made the striking of attitudes into an art form, portraying classical themes such as the Judgement of Paris.

Mimoplastic art (also known as attitudes) is a performance art genre depicting works of art by use of mime, especially gestures and draping. Mimoplastic "attitude" is differentiated from the tableau vivant by its imitation of classical sculpture. The genre depicted works of art, particularly classical subjects.

== History ==
It was popularized by Emma, Lady Hamilton. Hamilton's art form may have developed after modelling for the painter, George Romney. Goethe wrote in 1787, "with a few shawls (she) gives so much variety to her poses, gestures, expressions etc., that the spectator can hardly believe his eyes... This much is certain: as a performance it is like nothing you ever saw before in your life". The art form trended among upperclass European women between 1770 and 1815. They created mimoplastic art in their homes. Ida Brun's attitudes included background music and narratives. The literary scholar Henning Fenger (1921-1985), stated that Brun's "mimoplastic art captivated Europe". Other notable performers included Henriette Hendel-Schütz and the only male performer of attitudes, Gustav Anton von Seckendorff.

== See also ==
- Attitude (fine art)
