= Hymn Before Sunrise =

"Hymn Before Sunrise" is a poem written by Samuel Taylor Coleridge in 1802. Originally published in The Morning Post, it describes feelings that Coleridge claimed to have experienced on his own. However, it was later revealed that parts of the poem were heavily influenced by a poem by Friederike Brun, which led to criticism against Coleridge for not acknowledging his sources. Aspects of the poem did have direct origin in Coleridge's own life and experiences, and the work represents one of the last times a poem captured his feelings of joy during that period of his life.

== Background ==
During 1802, Coleridge wrote the poem Hymn Before Sunrise, which he based on his translation of a poem by Brun. However, Coleridge told William Southeby another story about what inspired him to write the poem in a 10 September 1802 letter: "I involuntarily poured forth a Hymn in the manner of the Psalms, tho' afterwards I thought the Ideas &c disproportionate to our humble mountains—& accidentally lighting on a short Note in some swiss Poems, concerning the Vale of Chamouny, & it's Mountain, I transferred myself thither, in the Spirit, & adapted my former feelings to these grander external objects".

The poem was first published in the 11 September 1802 Morning Post as part of a series of poems by Coleridge during September through October 1802. The poem was printed six other times, with a few changes to the poem including two passages that were changed and one added by an edition printed in Coleridge's The Friend (26 October 1809).

Coleridge's use of an unacknowledged source was described by Thomas de Quincey, a contemporary of Coleridge, as plagiarism. This claim has since been brought up many times by scholars trying to determine Coleridge's actual sources for the poem. The original poem, "Chamonix beym Sonnenaufgange", dated May 1791, was published in Brun's collection Gedichte. Although Brun is a source, she is one among others, and the poem is similar to many of Coleridge's poems before he read Brun's poetry.

== Poem ==
The poem begins with a joyful discovery:

O dread and silent Mount! I gazed upon thee,
Till thou, still present to the bodily sense,
Didst vanish from my thought: entranced in prayer
I worshipped the Invisible alone.

Yet, like some sweet beguiling melody,
So sweet, we know not we are listening to it,
Thou, the meanwhile, wast blending with my Thought,
Yea, with my Life and Life's own secret Joy:
Till the dilating Soul, enrapt, transfused,
Into the mighty vision passing—there
As in her natural form, swelled vast to Heaven!

— lines 13–23

In part of the poem, Coleridge merges his own experience with the language borrowed from Brun:

And you, ye five wild torrents fiercely glad!
Who called you forth from night and utter death,
From dark and icy caverns called you forth,
Down those precipitous, black, jaggéd rocks,
For ever shattered and the same for ever?

— lines 39–43

== Themes ==
In a manner similar to Coleridge's Kubla Khan, Hymn Before Sunrise describes a type of miraculous event in which singing rings out while mountain ice is melted by the sun. This draws a relationship between art and nature. In describing the sublime, Coleridge offers a contrast to the view held by Edmund Burke and William Wordsworth, which Coleridge described as a masculine presentation of the material in a matter-of-fact manner. Instead, Coleridge suggests a sublime through identifying with the matter. The joy that Coleridge experienced within the poem was not to last as the poems that followed over the next few years contained contrary feelings.

== Sources ==
Coleridge was introduced to Brun's poem by August 1800, when his friend Wordsworth relied on the work for the story The Seven Sisters. Besides the Brun source, there are other poems which are used within the work, including William Bowles's Coombe Ellen. In describing works about the mountains in general, Coleridge may have used other poems by Brun or a poem by Friedrich Leopold zu Stolberg-Stolberg. There are also lines that are similar to those in John Milton's Comus and the Book of Exodus.

Brun's "Chamouny at Sunrise" begins:

From the deep shadow of the silent fir-grove
I lift my eyes, and trembling look on thee,
Brow of eternity, thou dazzling peak,
From whose calm height my dreaming spirit mounts
And soars away into the infinite!

Who sank the pillar in the lap of earth,
Down deep, the pillar of eternal rock,
On which thy mass stands firm, and firm had stood,
While centuries on centuries rolled along?
Who reared, up-towering through the vaulted blue,
Mighty and bold, thy radiant countenance?

Who poured you from on high with thunder-sound,
Down from old winter's everlasting realm,
O jagged streams, over rock and through ravine?
And whose almighty voice commanded loud,
"Here shall the stiffening billows rest awhile!"

— lines 1-16

== Critical response ==
Richard Holmes points out that the lines from Brun cause problems for Coleridge. In particular, "Even in the best passages, closest to his own observations, this foreign rhetoric weakens the borrowed verse by comparison with his own prose." However, he continues, "The rhythms are powerful, but one looks in vain for the manic white bears, the prayer-wheels, or the falling angels. All have been suppressed." On the relationship of the hymn to Brun's poem, Adam Sisman claims, "it was ominous that both the poem itself and the introductory note he added to the published version should falsely suggest first-hand experience. He was not being truthful to the public, and he was not being true to himself. Chamonix was a place that Wordsworth had seen, but Coleridge had not. He had lost his independent vision".
