= Sophienholm =

Building in Lyngby, Denmark

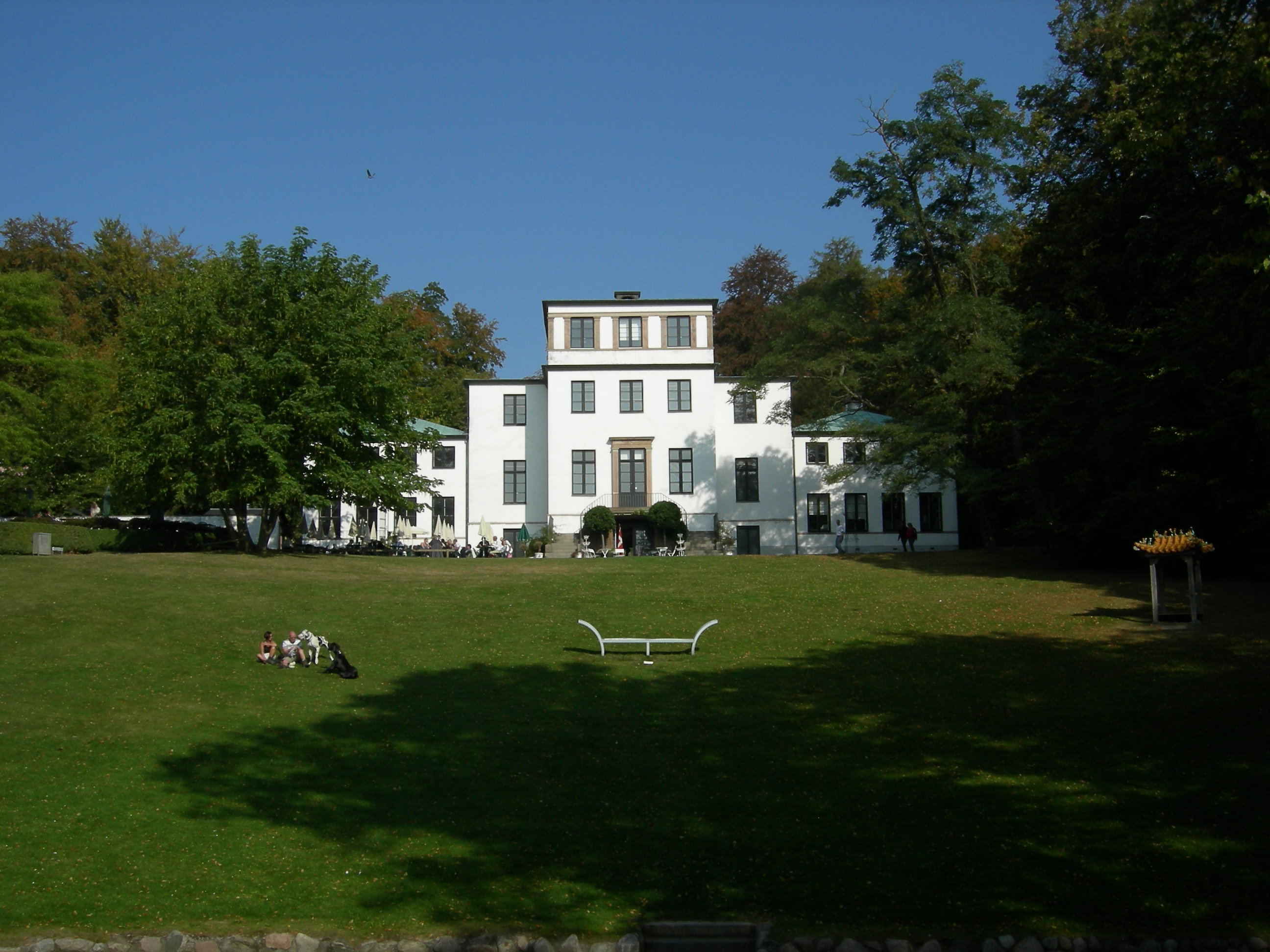
- Sophienholm
- Interactive map of the Sophienholm area

General information
- Architectural style: Neoclassicism
- Location: Lyngby, Denmark
- Coordinates: 55.7754°N 12.4576°E
- Construction started: 1800
- Completed: 1805
- Client: Johan Theodor Holmskiold

Design and construction
- Architect: Joseph-Jacques Ramée

Sophienholm is a former manor house and exhibition venue located north on the shore of Lake Bagsværd in Lyngby-Taarbæk Municipality in the northern outskirts of Copenhagen, Denmark.

The main building was originally a country home built in 1769 by Johan Theodor Holmskiold who named the house after his wife Sophie Holmskjold. Its next owner, Constantin Brun, had it completely rebuilt at the turn of the 19th century into its present appearance, and it became a lively cultural venue during the Danish Golden Age when his wife, the writer and salonist Friederike Brun, played host to many prominent Danish and foreign cultural figures of the time.

== History ==
=== Early history ===
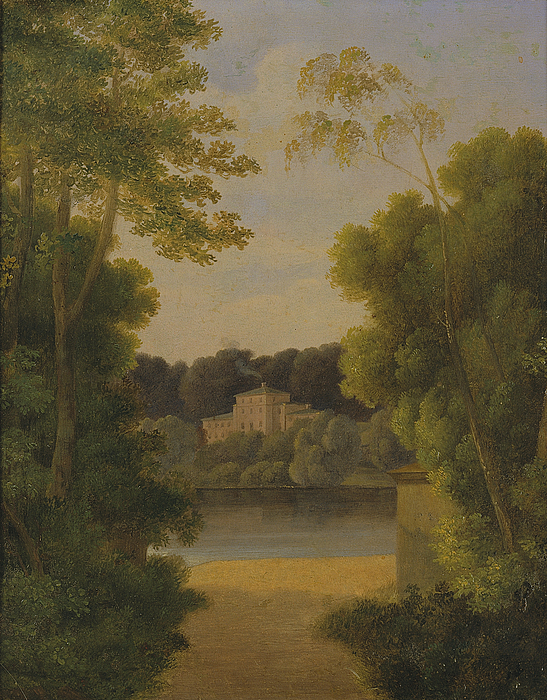
Sophienholm as it appeared after the rebuilding, painting by J. L. Lund

Sophienholm was built from 1767 to 1768 as a country retreat for Johan Theodor Holmskiold (1731–1793). The country house was in a classicist style and the garden transformed into English landscape style. Originally a medical doctor and naturalist, Holmskiold had just begun a successful career at the Royal Court in Copenhagen and as a director for several prominent state enterprises. He named the house after his fiancée Sophia Magdalena de Schrødersee (1746–1801). They married in 1770 and owned the property until 1790 when he built himself a new and larger country home nearby.

The new owner of Sophienholm was the merchant Constantin Brun (1746–1836). Originally from Germany, he had come to Denmark as royal administrator of trade in the Danish West Indies and made a fortune on trade during the early Napoleonic Wars, profiting from Denmark's neutrality. In 1783, Constantin Brun married Friederike Brun, née Münther (1765–1835).

At the turn of the century, he commissioned Joseph-Jacques Ramée (1764–1842) to redesign and expand the main building. Completed in 1805, Ramée's project also redesigned the park and added several smaller buildings to the site, including a Norwegian house, a Chinese pavilion, a Swiss cottage and a gate house. Later two lateral wings were added to the main building.

=== Golden Age venue ===
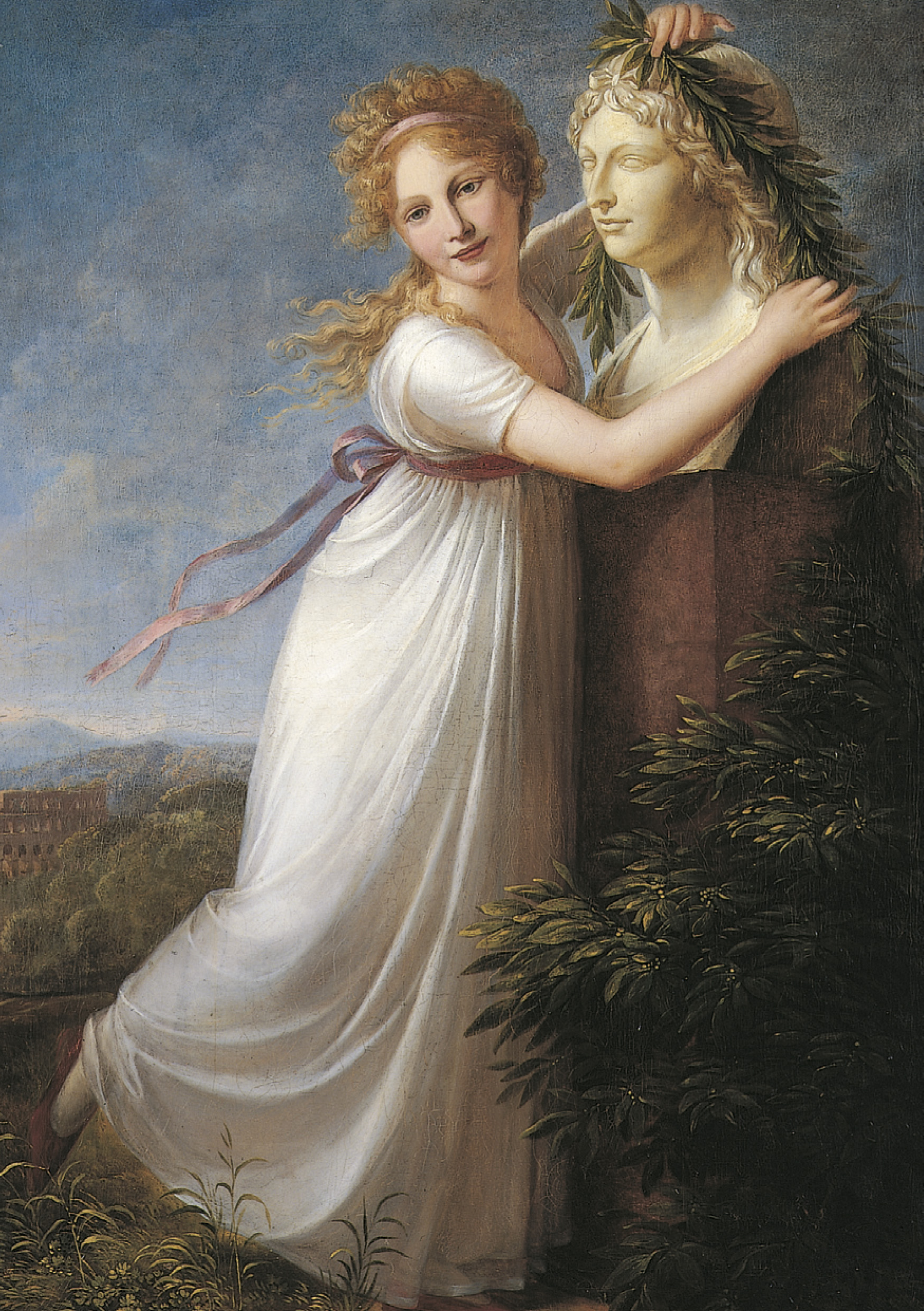
Ida Brun putting a wreath on her mother's bust

While the Bruns resided at Sophienholm, the estate developed into a lively cultural venue when the culturally inclined Friederike used it for salons. An inspiration for this activity was Madame de Staël, a close friend from her travels who was famous for her salons at Château de Coppet. Friederike Brun's salons attracted a colourful mix of celebrated poets and poor and unknown students, composers, foreign diplomats, foreign artists of any kind, and even members of the royal family. Among the most frequent guests were Jens Baggesen, Oehlenschläger, Schack von Staffeldt, a young Johan Ludvig Heiberg, J. M. Thiele and B. S. Ingemann.

Contemporary memoires and letter literature provide a detailed image of how the salon life at Sophienholm unfolded. In the day time, the park was a popular venue for the house guests who would have tea or hot chocolate in the Norwegian House in the afternoon, sometimes also in the evening. Imported donkeys were used for excursions in the surrounding countryside. At dinner time, the guests were treated with food and wine "in abundance" and afterwards coffee was served in the Picture Room, located on the ground floor, facing the forest. Besides general conversation, the entertainment included various literary and musical activities. Friederike often read aloud letters from her many famous friends abroad, and guests entertained with recitations of poetry or musical performances. Constantin Brun, who did not share Friederike's cultural inclination, would usually retire early, either to his private chambers or to a quiet corner to play cards and complain about his wife's extravagance.

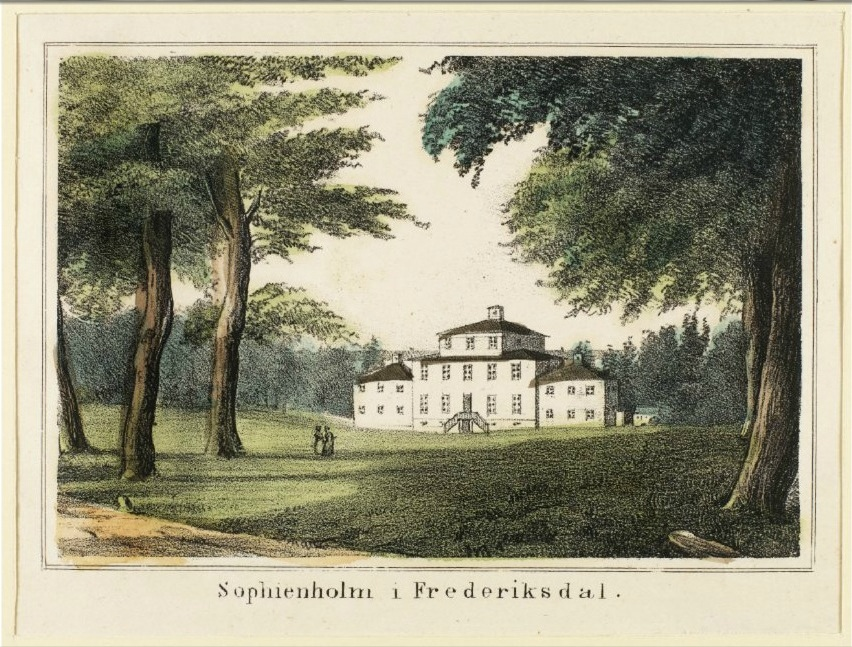
Sophienholm painted by H.G.F. Holm, c. 1828

A central part of the salon life was Ida Brun (1792–1857), Constantin and Friederike Brun's oldest daughter. She had many prominent admirers both among the guests at Sophienholm and the prominent personages she met on travels with her parents around Europe, including Bertel Thorvaldsen in Rome. She performed at her mother's soirées both with singing and attitudes, a cross between postures, dance and acting, which she had learned directly from their inventor, Lady Hamilton in Naples. When Ida Brun married Louis Philippe de Bombelles (1780–1843), the Austrian Ambassador to Denmark, and left the country, the salons at Sophienholm faded out.

=== After the Brun era ===
The Brun era ended in 1836 when Constantin and Friederike Brun died within a few months of each other. Ida Brun inherited Sophienholm but immediately sold it. In 1882, the estate was bought by Carl Aller (1845-1926), founder of Carl Allers Etablissement, a fast expanding publishing house. Sophienholm stayed in hands of the Aller family until it was bought by Lyngby-Taarbæk Municipality in 1963. They renovated the building and opened it to the public as an exhibition building at the initiative of mayor Paul Fenneberg.

== Sopheinholm today ==
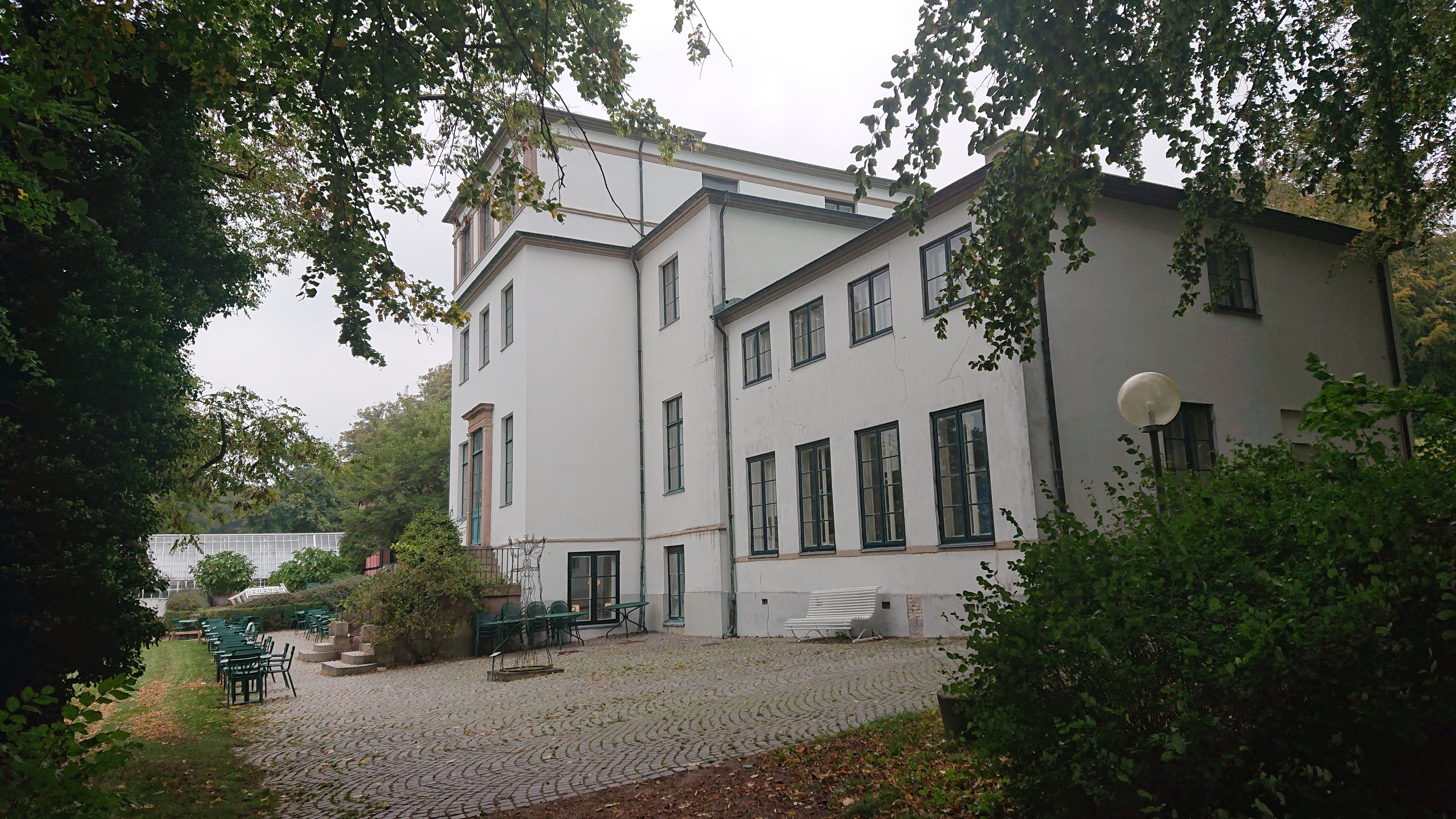
Sophienholm

Sophienholm hosts 4–5 exhibitions a year. The park is used for concerts.

== List of former owners ==
From	To	Owners
1767	1790	Johan Theodor Holmskiold
1790	1820	Constantin Brun
1820	1835	Friederike Brun
1835	1836	Ida Constantinsdatter Brun
1836	1842	Ph. Jul. Knudsen
1842	1853	Count Siegfred Raben
1853	1863	Claus Moltzen
1863	1882	Rogert Fønss
1882	1926	Carl Aller
1926	1943	Axel Aller / Valdemar Aller / Rigmor Rand née Aller / Ragna Aller
1943	1953	Valdemar Aller / Rigmor Rand née Aller / Ragna Aller
1953	1963	Rigmor Rand née Aller / Ragna Aller
1963		Lyngby-Taarbæk Municipality

== See also ==
- Øregård Museum
