= Ida Brun =

Danish singer, dancer, and classical mime artist

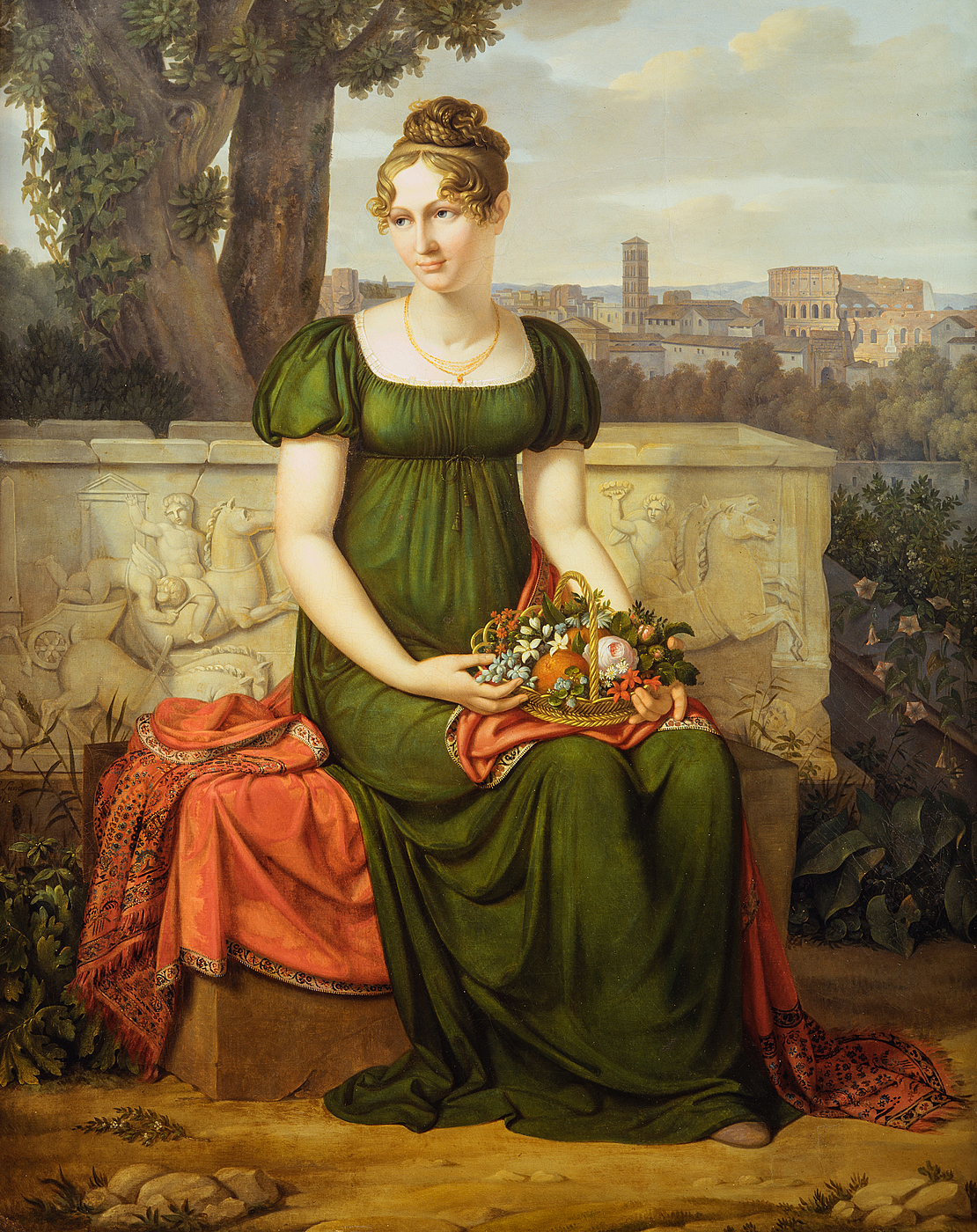
Portrait of Ida Brun, by J.L. Lund (1811)

Adelaide Caroline Johanne Brun (known as Ida Brun and later as Ida (de) Bombelles; 20 September 1792 – 23 November 1857) was a Danish singer, dancer, and classical mime artist in the genre known as mimoplastic art or "attitude". The literary scholar, Henning Fenger (1921–1985), described Brun as "a shapely, classic blond whose mimoplastic art captivated Europe".

== Biography ==
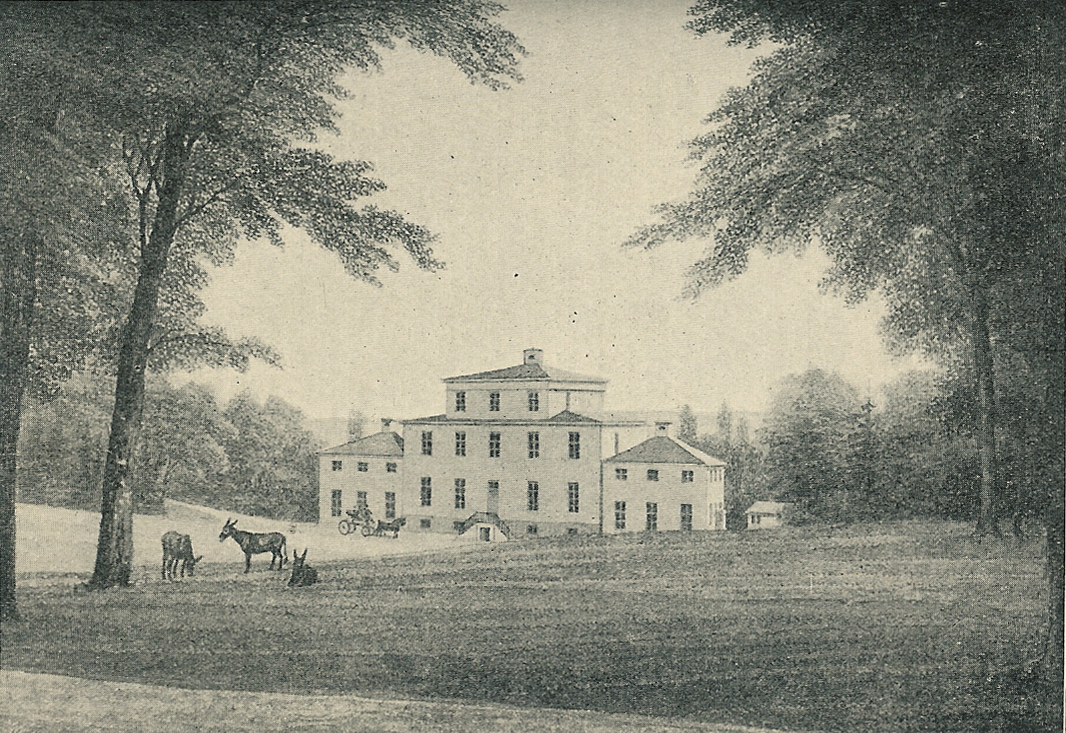
Sofienholm, by H.G.F. Holm (1826–1828)

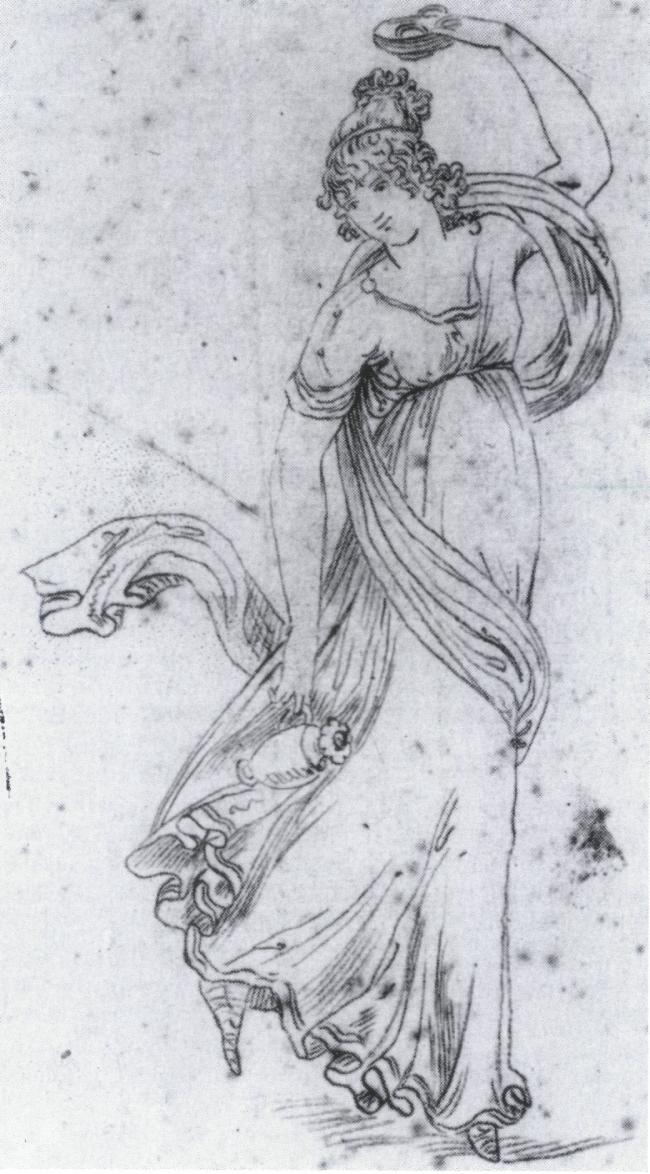
Ida Brun presenting an attitude, by C.H. Kniep (c. 1815)

Brun was born in 1792 at Sophienholm, the family estate in Lyngby. She was the youngest daughter of Constantin, an affluent merchant, and Friederike Brun, an author and salon hostess. She was one of five children; her siblings included Carl Friedrich Balthasar Brun (1784–1869), Charlotte Brun (born 1788), and Augusta (Guste) Brun (1790). From an early age, she exhibited the ability to perform as a singer and dancer, thanks to the encouragement of her mother, who had been impressed by the "attitudes" (or "living sculptures") developed by Lady Emma Hamilton, whom she had seen in Naples in 1796. Together with her mother, Ida travelled to Germany, Switzerland, and Italy from 1801 to 1810. Wherever she went, she was trained in singing, music, and dance by the best possible instructors, already performing for Goethe in Jena in 1803 at age 11. In her performances, she would move delicately into each position, freezing for a few seconds before gracefully draping herself in the folds of her tunic so as to represent classical figures such as Iphigenia, Galatea, Eurydice, Diana, Aurora, and Althaea. Her postures are recorded in drawings by the German Christoph Heinrich Kniep and in the poems of Alphonse de Lamartine, as well as in her mother's correspondence and in her 1824 biography "Idas ästhetische Entwickelung" (Ida's Aesthetic Development).

Her attitude presentations were admired by contemporary artists such as Johann Wolfgang von Goethe, August Wilhelm Schlegel, Germaine de Staël, and particularly by Bertel Thorvaldsen. She became just as famous for her mimed attitudes as Lady Hamilton herself and was idolized as the very ideal of art by all the male visitors who attended the salons. She was also noted for her singing, emulating Angelica Catalani, one of Italy's foremost opera singers of the period. Other female artists of the day, such as Henriette Hendel-Schütz in Germany, also presented "attitudes" along similar lines.

Brun's mother had seen Hamilton perform attitudes in 1796 and it was she who instructed Brun in the art. Although Brun's performances had similarity to that of Hamilton in style and range, Brun included background music and narratives. Brun developed the attitudes of small ballets, performing without charging fees or receiving a salary, as she came from one of the richest families in Denmark. Tickets were never sold to her exclusive private performances. Under pressure to perform, she developed anorexia. From 1806 to 1816, Brun was one of the main attractions in the salons hosted by her mother in Copenhagen, Geneva and Rome.

In 1816, she married the Austrian ambassador in Denmark, Count Louis Philippe de Bombelles (1780–1843). The marriage was regarded by some as an escape. Bombelles was surprisingly unimpressed by his wife. His strong sense of humor appealed to Brun. After her marriage, Brun concentrated on singing until her husband's death in 1843, when she became the companion of Napoleon's widow, Marie Louise of Parma, who died in 1847. She then moved to Vienna, where she died in 1857.

== Reproductions ==
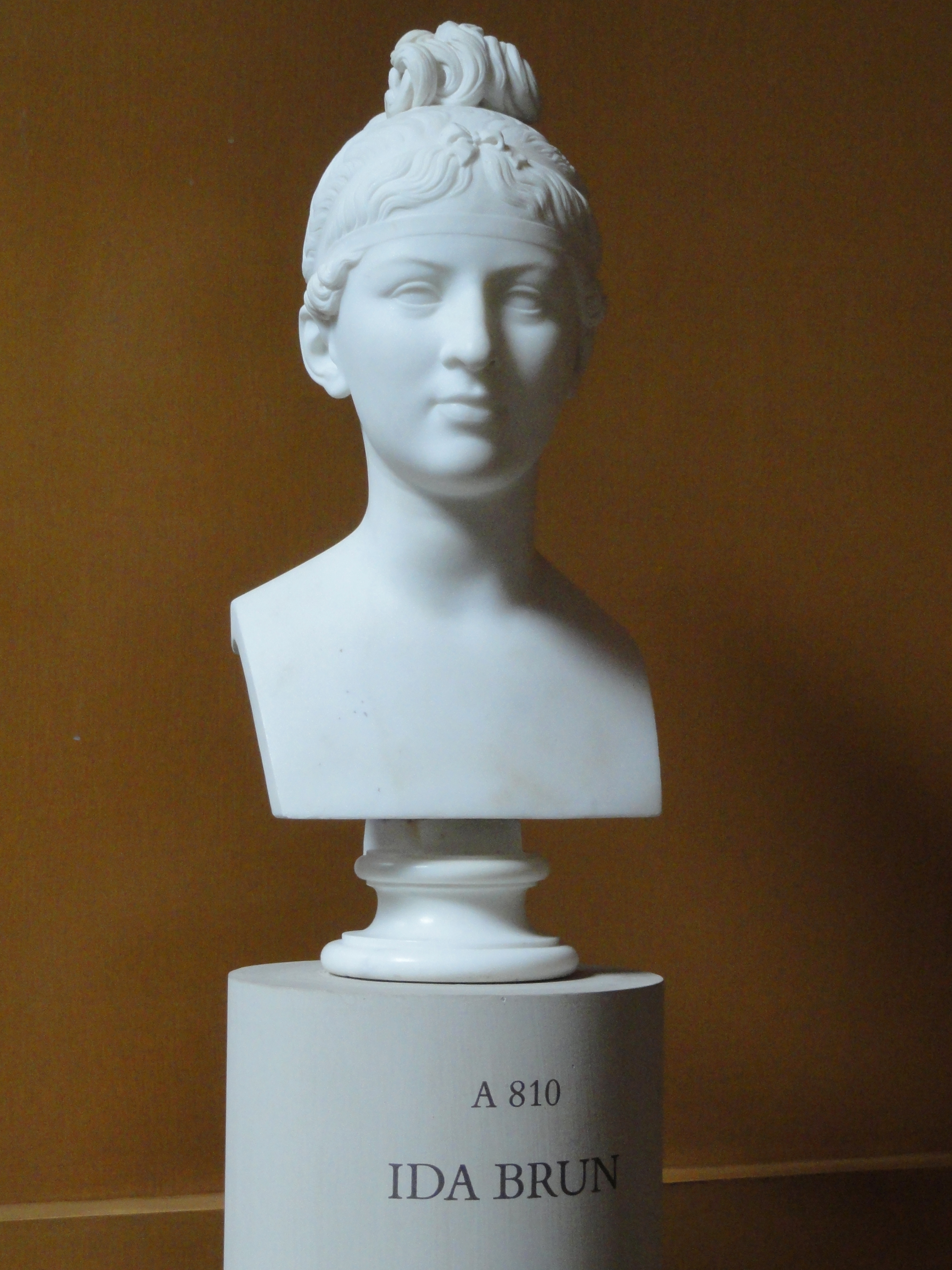
Sculpture of Ida Brun, by Bertel Thorvaldsen

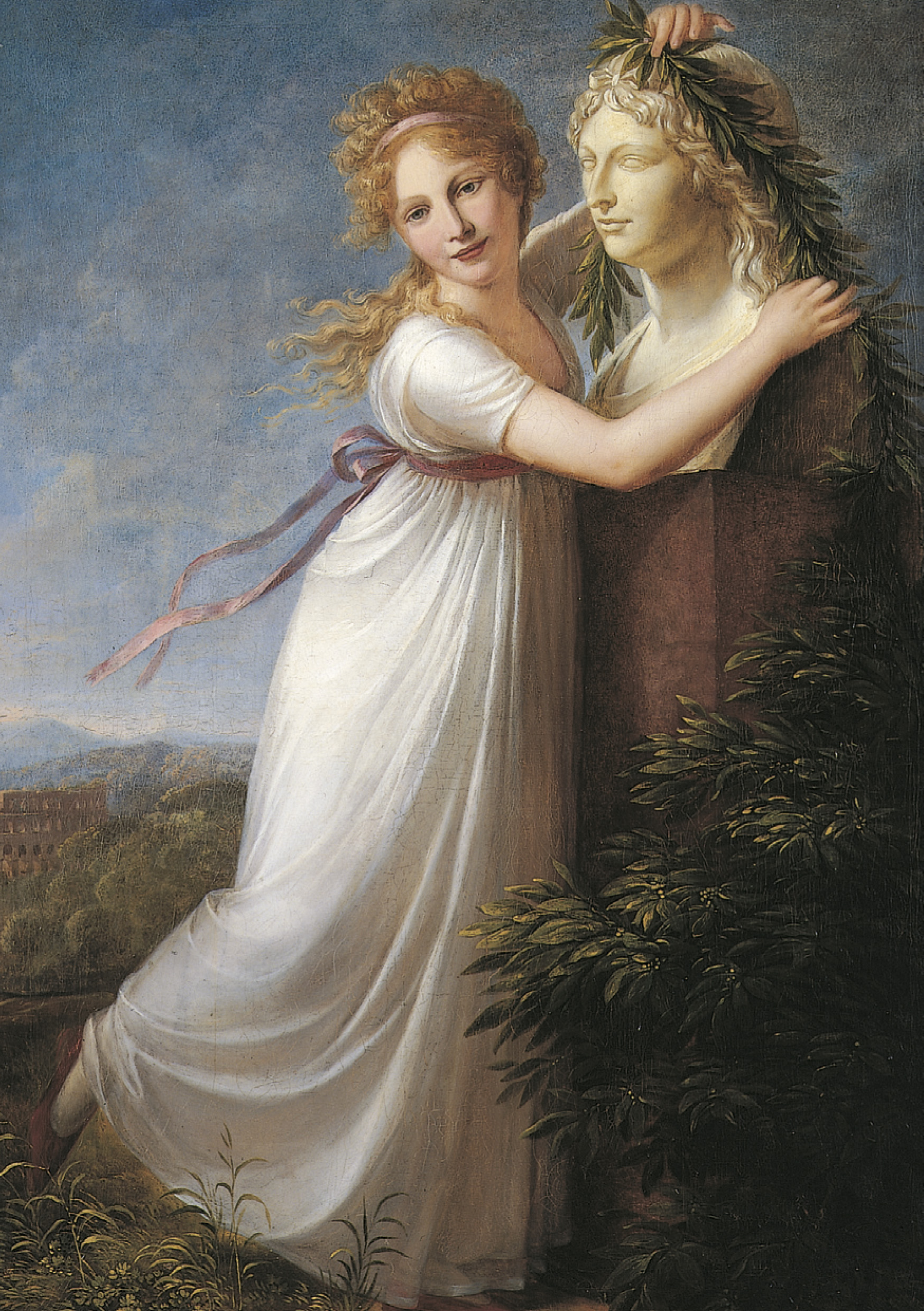
Ida Brun with her mother's bust, oil painting by P.F. von Hetsch (1803)

Thorvaldsen had undertaken to give drawing lessons to Brun but he preferred having her sing to him, while he accompanied her on the guitar. Deeply impressed by Brun's beauty and grace, in 1810, Thorvaldsen modelled a portrait bust of Brun. The original is located at Thorvaldsen Museum and there is a replica at Bakkehuset; it was reproduced in lithograph in 1851. Staël, a friend of Brun's mother, makes mention of Thorvaldsen's bust in her work, On Germany:

I have already said that sculpture in general has suffered by the entire neglect of the art of dancing; the only phenomenon of that art in Germany is Ida Brun, a young girl whose social position excludes her from artist-life. She has received from nature, and from her mother, an extraordinary talent for representing the most touching pictures or the finest statues by simple gestures. Her dancing is just a succession of ephemeral masterpieces, which one longs to fix for ever; and Ida's mother has conceived in her thoughts everything which her child expresses by her movements... I have seen Ida, while still a child, represent Althaea about to burn the torch on which the life of her son Meleager depends; she expressed, without a word, the grief, the mental strife, the terrible resolution of a mother. No doubt her animated looks served to make us understand what was passing in her heart, but the art of varying her gestures, and draping herself artistically in the purple mantle which she wore, produced at least as much effect as her countenance. She frequently remained a long time in the same attitude, and each time no painter could have invented anything better than the picture which she improvised. Such a talent is unique.

Other reproductions include:

- Thumbnail by Cornelius Høyer (ca. 1795) (depicting Ida or her sister)
- Drawing by C.H. Kniep (1805–10) (Bakkehusmuseet)
- Portrait painting by P.F. Hetsch (1803) (in private ownership)
- Drawing by Johan Ludwig Lund (Museum of National History at Frederiksborg Castle, reproduced in wood carving, 1884)
- Portrait paintings in Rome by Lund in several editions (1810–11) (Bakkehusmuseet and Sparresholm, the latter burned ca. 2013)
- Portrait painting by Bernhard von Guérard (ca. 1829)
- Daguerreotype (23 August 1847) (Royal Library)
- Portrait by H.N. Hansen (ca. 1894)
- Silhouette depicting Brun, age 12 years
- Miniature
- Three small round drawings by G.L. Lahde (Royal Library)

== Literature ==
- Brun, Friederike (1824). Wahrheit aus Morgenträumen und Idas ästhetische Entwickelung. Sauerländer. ISBN 978-3-628-37044-1.
- Schlegel, A. W.von. August Wilhelm Von Schlegel's Sämmtliche Werke. Рипол Классик. p. 253. ISBN 978-5-87418-688-3.
