= Henriette Hendel-Schütz =

German actress, mimoplastic performer, dancer and singer

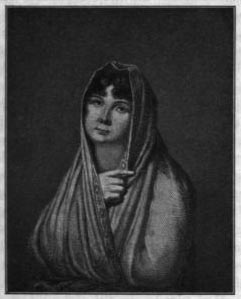
- Henriette Hendel-Schütz (ca. 1815)
- Born: Johanne Henriette Rosine Schüler'; 13 February 1772; Döbeln
- Died: 1849; Köslin
- Occupations: actor, singer
- Years active: 1796 - 1818
- Spouse: Friedrich Eunicke

Johanne Henriette Rosine Hendel-Schütz, née Schüler, (1772–1849) was a German actress, mimoplastic performer, dancer and singer.

== Biography ==
Born on 13 February 1772 in Döbeln, Saxony, Hendel-Schütz was the daughter of the actor Carl Julius Christian Schüler. While still a small child, she performed at the Ekhof-Theater in Gotha, where since 1775 she had been taught to dance by von Mereau, the court's dancing master. After a period in Breslau (1779–85), she attended the French school in Berlin where she was instructed by Johann Jakob Engel, the author of the widely acclaimed introduction to acting Ideen zu einer Mimik.

In 1788, when just 16, she married the opera singer Friedrich Eunicke with whom she toured to destinations including Mainz, Bonn, Amsterdam and Frankfurt am Main. In Frankfurt, she met the painter Johann Georg Pforr who introduced her to the "attitudes" of Lady Hamilton who in 1787 had developed a new form of entertainment, combining classical poses with modern allure in loose fitting garments in what became known as mimoplastic art. They had been published as etchings inspired by the drawings of Friedrich Rehberg.

Hendel-Schütz performed at theatres in Berlin (1796–1806) and Halle (1807–09). Her fourth marriage was with the historian Friedrich Karl Julius Schütz who accompanied her on her theatrical tours, on occasion also performing on the stage.

From 1808, her appearances became increasingly based on her mimoplastic miming as she represented mythological figures in the Renaissance style, often basing her acts on paintings or statues. After first presenting them in Frankfurt, she took her imitations to Finland, Sweden, Denmark, the Netherlands and France. Hendel-Schütz retired from the stage in 1818. Her retirement was spent in Stargard and later in Köslin where she died on 4 March 1849.
