= Constantin Brun =

German-Danish merchant

Johan Christian Constantin Brun
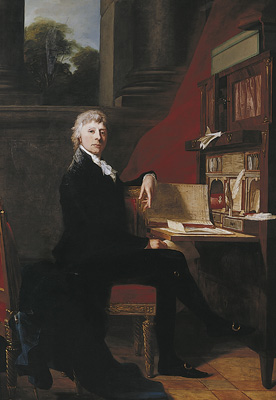
- Constantin Brun, portray by Jean-Laurent Mosnier (1808)
- Born: 27 November 1746; Rostock, Duchy of Mecklenburg-Schwerin, Holy Roman Empire
- Died: 19 February 1836 (aged 89); Copenhagen, Denmark
- Occupation: Businessman
- Known for: Danish West India Company; Sophienholm
- Spouse: Friederike Brun
- Awards: Grand Cross of the Dannebrog

Johan Christian Constantin Brun (27 November 1746 – 19 February 1836) was a German-Danish merchant. Born in Germany, came to Denmark as Royal administrator of the trade on the Danish West Indies and in the same time built a successful private trading empire during the early Napoleonic Wars of the late 18th century, profiting on Denmark's neutrality.

At the time of his death in 1836, Brun was one of the wealthiest persons in Denmark, leaving an estate of more than 2 million Rigsdaler. He was married to Friederike Brun, a writer and prominent salonist during the Danish Golden Age.

== Early life and career ==
Constantin Brun was born into a poor family on 27 November 1746 in Rostock. He moved to Lübeck to Apprentice in Pauli, one of the local trading houses, and after showing a remarkable talent for business, his employer set him up, along with his own son, with a business in Saint Petersburg, Russia.

On 16 October 1777, Brun received an appointment as Danish Consul and this brought him to Copenhagen. There he met his future wife, Friederike, for the first time when he visited her father, Balthasar Münter, who was a priest at the St. Peter's Church, Copenhagen. He was immediately struck by the young girl, and in the winter of 1782/83 he returned to Copenhagen.

== Career in Denmark ==
The Danish Government had become aware of his eminent talent for business and, presumably at Count von Schimmelmann's initiative, offered him a position as royal administrator of the trade on the Danish West Indies. Brun accepted, settled in Copenhagen and proposed to Friederikke Münter, who accepted, later that same year. Under Brun, Danish trade on the West Indies passed over from the Danish West India Company to the state. During the following decades, the trade flourished, assisted by Denmark's neutrality in the European wars which raged at the time.

Brun also ran his own private business and over the years built a colossal fortune.

In 1788-99 the Danish Government send Brun on a diplomatic mission to Russia, an allied of Denmark, with financial support for the Russian war against Sweden.

== Property ==
Brun was the owner of several large estates and prominent homes. In 1790 he bought Sophienholm in Lyngby as a summer residence supplementing his town mansion in Copenhagen. From 1800 to 1805 he had it extended and redesigned to its present-day appearance with the assistance of the French architect Joseph-Jacques Ramée.

Over the next decade he acquired first Antvorskov Manor and later Falkensteen Manor, both located near Slagelse, and made many progressive modernizations to the agricultural operations of the estates. He imported several families from Switzerland and established a production of Swiss cheese which was mainly exported to oversea markets. He also marketed chopping and threshing machines.

In 1810 Brun bought Krogerup Manor for his sons. The estate stayed in the Brun family until 1939.

== Family and personal life ==
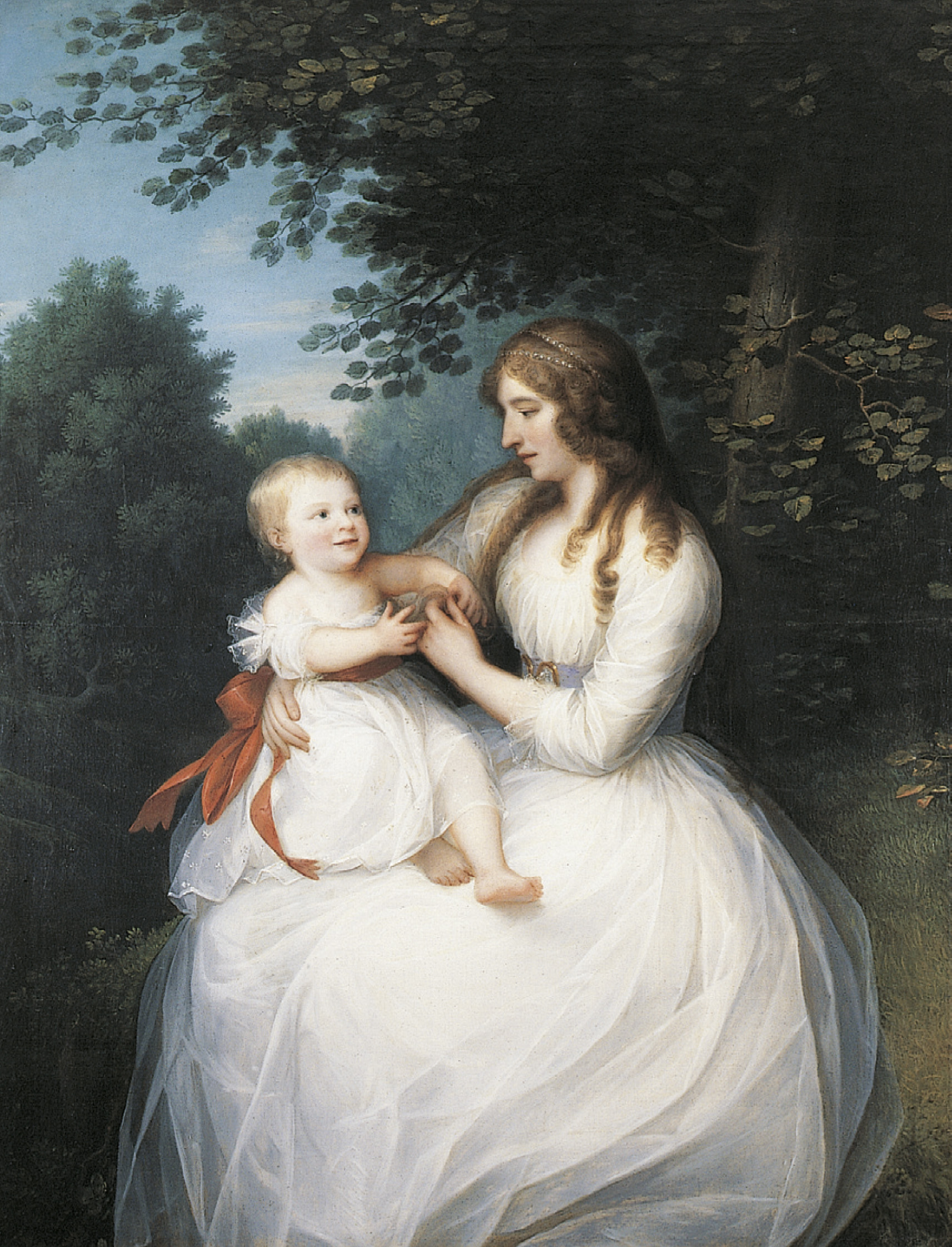
Friederike Brun with daughter Charlotte, painting by Erik Pauelsen (1780)

His wife, Friederike Brun, was a writer and played host to many prominent Danish artists and intellectuals of her day. Particularly her salons at Sophienholm enjoyed great popularity. She also socialized and kept up a correspondence with many leading cultural figures around Europe.

Constantin Brun himself took no interest in these activities, routinely referring to them as "poetic madness". His parsimonious reputation is reflected in his comment that he "saw the moon as a time counter and as a good bright light which shone without the need for payment." He found Friederike's social habits extravagant, but she always got her way, and he was obviously flattered by the fact that it was his wealth which made it all possible.

=== Children ===
- Carl Friedrich Balthasar Brun (20 April 1784 – 14 November 1869), Chamberlain
- Charlotte Brun (1788)
- Augusta Brun (1790)
- Adelaide Caroline Johanne Brun (20 September 1792 - 23 November 1857)

== See also ==
- Sophienholm
