= Friederike Brun =

Danish author and salonist

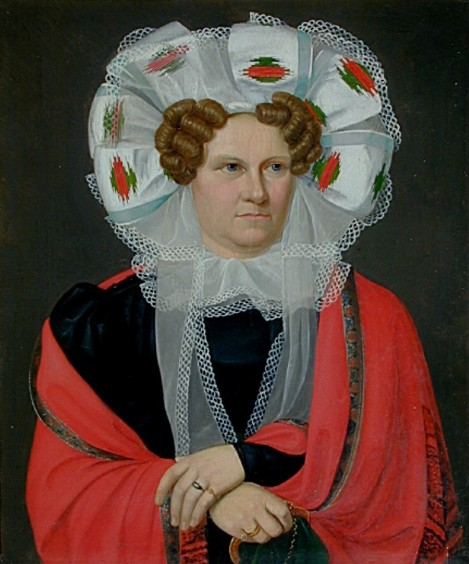
- Friederike Brun portrayed by C. W Eckersberg (1818)
- Born: 3 June 1765; Gräfentonna, Saxe-Gotha-Altenburg
- Died: 25 March 1835 (aged 69); Copenhagen, Denmark
- Known for: Salons
- Spouse: Constantin Brun

Friederike Brun, née Münther (3 June 1765 – 25 March 1835), was a Danish author and salonist.

She was married to the affluent merchant Constantin Brun and during the Danish Golden Age of the first half of the 19th century she arranged literary salons at Sophienholm, their summer retreat north of Copenhagen. She is known for writing the poem Chamouny at Sunrise which was the original of Samuel Taylor Coleridge's Hymn in the Vale of Chamouni.

== Early life ==
Friederike Brun was born on 3 June 1765 in Gräfentonna, in present-day Thuringia, Germany. Her father was Balthasar Münter, a writer and theologian, and the family moved to Denmark shortly after Friederike 's birth when he assumed a position as priest at St. Peter's Church in Copenhagen, the church of the city's German congregation. She was a bright child and acquired a thorough knowledge of literature and other cultural subjects in the intellectual home although never receiving any formal schooling. Her family enjoyed frequent visits from German and Danish literary figures such as Friedrich Gottlieb Klopstock, Johann Andreas Cramer, and the brothers Christian and Friedrich Leopold zu Stolberg-Stolberg, and Johannes Ewald. In 1783, at the age of 17, she married the wealthy merchant Constantin Brun.

== Literary career and travels ==
At the time, there was virtually not a man or a woman of any relevance in Denmark, Germany, Switzerland or Italy whom she did not know, with whom she had not had friendly relations, whose character, with imagination and understanding, she was not more or less able to determine and describe in the finest detail.

— Adam Oehlenschläger.

Friederike Brun's father had her first poetic experiments, as well as a travel account from Germany, published as early as 1782. These two genre also dominated the rest of her literary career. Her travelogues were fostered by a comprehensive travel activity which she, backed up by her husband's ample financial means, undertook from 1789 to 1810, for some time in company with Princess Louisa of Anhalt-Dessau (wife of Leopold III, Duke of Anhalt-Dessau) and the poet Matthisson.

On her travels, she met and befriended many leading European cultural figures of the day, and they feature prominently in her travel writings. With many of them she kept up a prolific correspondence. Among the European intellectuals she associated with were Johann Wolfgang von Goethe, Friedrich Schiller, August Wilhelm Schlegel, Johann Gottfried Herder, Wilhelm Grimm, and the Swiss female writer Madame de Staël with whom she formed a close friendship.

With Matthisson and with the historian Johannes von Müller, she spent some time in Switzerland in the house of Charles Victor de Bonstetten, who was afterward for several years her guest in Copenhagen. Bonstetten corresponded with her, and some of his letters were later published. After a long residence in Italy, she spent the rest of her life in Copenhagen.

== The salons ==
In addition to her work as an author, Friederike Brun is from 1788 known for her salons, held in the summer at Frederiksdal and in winters in Copenhagen. They were inspired by Madame de Staël's salons at Château de Coppet. Her daughter, Ida Brun, who presented mimed "attitudes" inspired by Lady Hamilton, was one of the main attractions at the salons she held in Copenhagen, Geneva and Rome from 1806 to 1816.

== Works ==
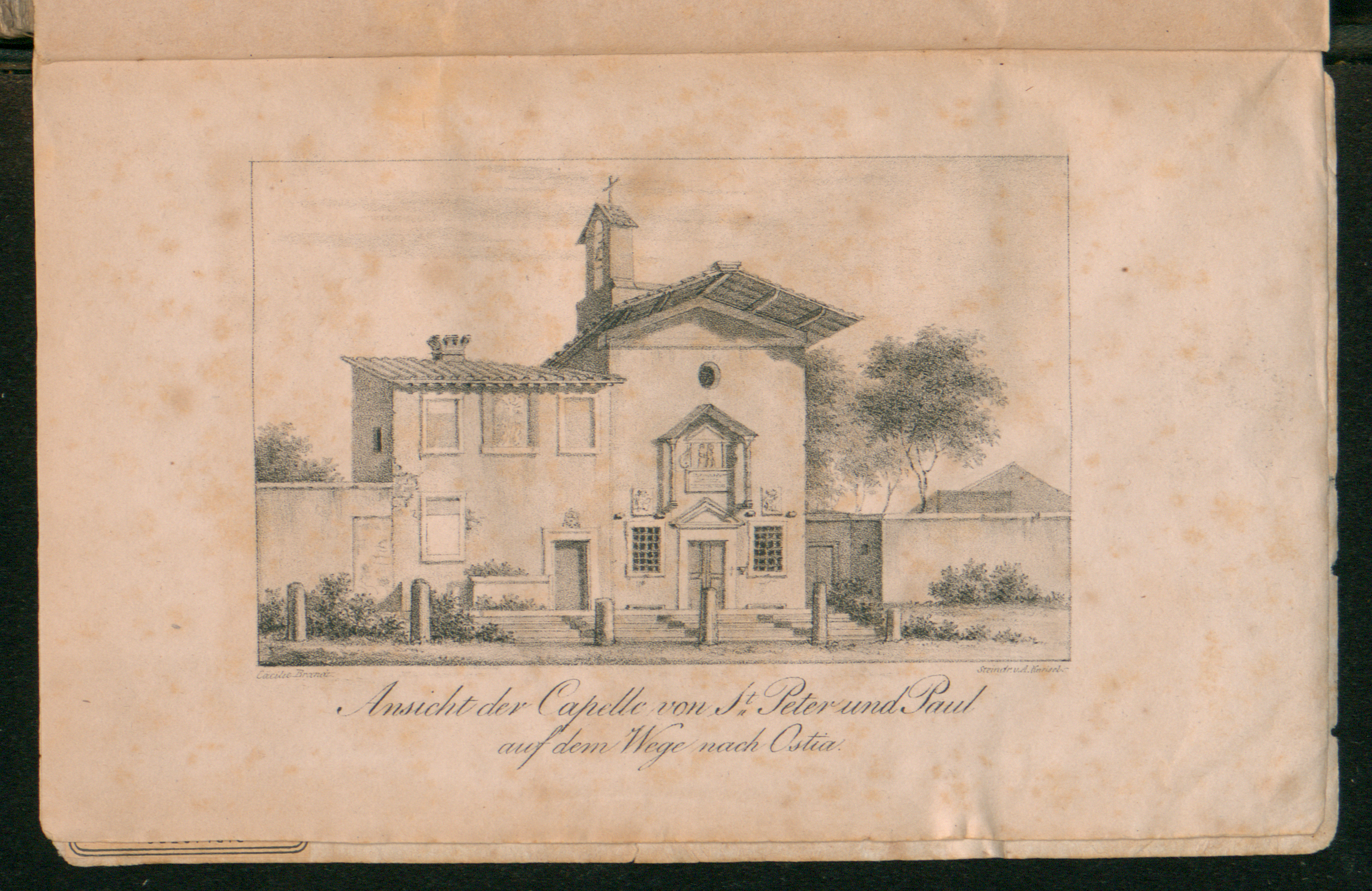
Römisches Leben, 1833

Her early poems, edited by Matthisson in 1795 (4th ed., Zürich, 1806), were followed by Neue Gedichte (Darmstadt, 1812), and Neueste Gedichte (Bonn, 1820). She described her travels in:

- Prosaische Schriften, 4 vols., Zürich, 1799-1801
- Brun, Friederike (1800). Tagebuch über Rom. Vol. 1. Zurich: Orell, Füssli und Compagnie.
- Brun, Friederike (1801). Tagebuch über Rom. Vol. 2. Zurich: Orell, Füssli und Compagnie.
- Tagebuch einer Reise durch die östliche, südliche und italienische Schweiz, 1800
- Episoden aus Reisen durch das südliche Deutschland etc., 4 vols., 1807-1818
- Brun, Friederike (1833). Römisches Leben. Vol. 1. Leipzig: Brockhaus.
- Brun, Friederike (1833). Römisches Leben. Vol. 2. Leipzig: Brockhaus.

Friederike Brun's published works as cited by An Encyclopedia of Continental Women Writers.

- Gedichte, 1782.
- Tagebuch meiner ersten Reise, 1782.
- Gedichte, 1795.
- Tagebuch über Rom, 1795–1796.
- Prosaische Schriften, I-IV, 1799–1801.
- Episoden aus Reisen, I-IV, 1806–1809. 1816; 1818.
- Briefe aus Rom, 1808–1810.
- Wahrheit aus Morgenträume, 1810–1824.
- Neue Gedichte, 1812.
- Brun, Friederike (1816). Gedichte. Vol. 1. Wien: Bauer.
- Brun, Friederike (1816). Gedichte. Vol. 2. Wien: Bauer.
- Neueste Gedichte, 1820.
- Idas ästhetische Enticklung, 1824.
- Briefe, Artiklen, Breiträge. Hören; Musenalmanach; Tris, Nytaarsgave for Dame; Minerva; Tilskueren. Römisches Leben, I-IV, 1833.

== See also ==
- Sophia Magdalena Krag Juel Vind
