= Karens Minde =

Building in Copenhagen, Denmark

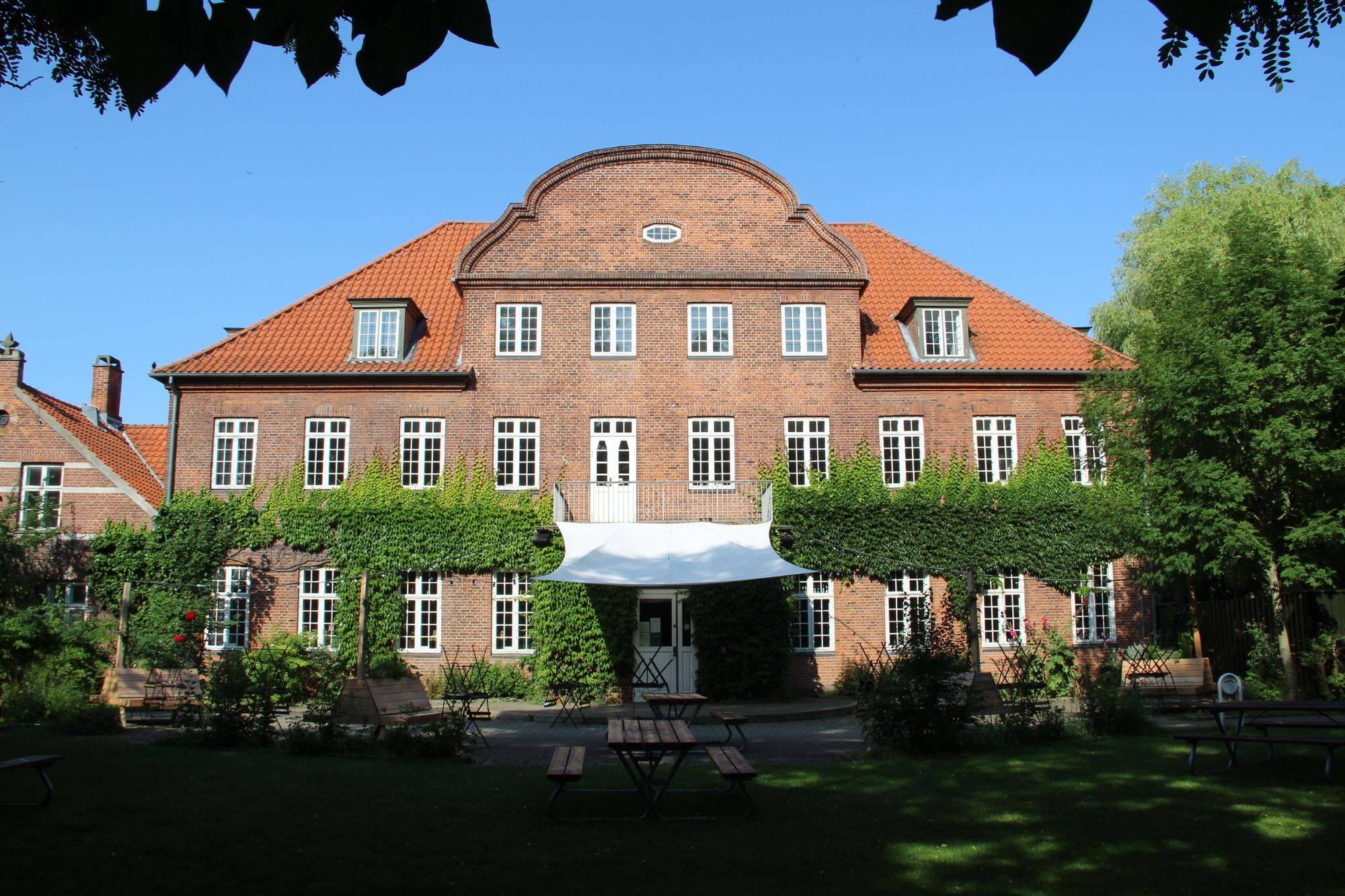
- Interactive map of the Karens Minde area

General information
- Architectural style: Renaissance Revival (1880), Neoclassical (1914 extension)
- Location: Copenhagen, Wagnersvej 19, 2450 København SV, Denmark
- Coordinates: 55°38′48.95″N 12°31′46.78″E
- Renovated: 1880
- Client: Johan Keller

Design and construction
- Architect: Vilhelm Klein

Karens Minde is a former mental institution from 1880 now operated as a local cultural centre in the Kongens Enghave district of Copenhagen, Denmark. Karens Minde was one of the so-called Kellerian Institutions, founded in 1867 by Johan Keller. The institution replaced a country house, with a history dating back to the 1890s, from which it took its name. The oldest part of the building from 1880 was designed by Vilhelm Klein in the Renaissance Revival style. A Neoclassical extension designed by Einar Thuxen was added in 1914. Three red-painted wooden buildings were moved to the site in 1949. They had previously been used for housing refugees at Kløvermarken. A now heritage-listed garden pavilion from Sankt Hans Hospital in Roskilde was moved to the site in 2002. Karens Minde houses a public library, Enghave Brygge Local Historic Archives and a wide range of cultural activities.

The surrounding greenspace, Karens Minde Aksen (The Karens Minde Axis), which was inaugurated in 2023, serves both as parkland, a greenway and as cloudburst protection.

== History ==
=== Lisesminde ===
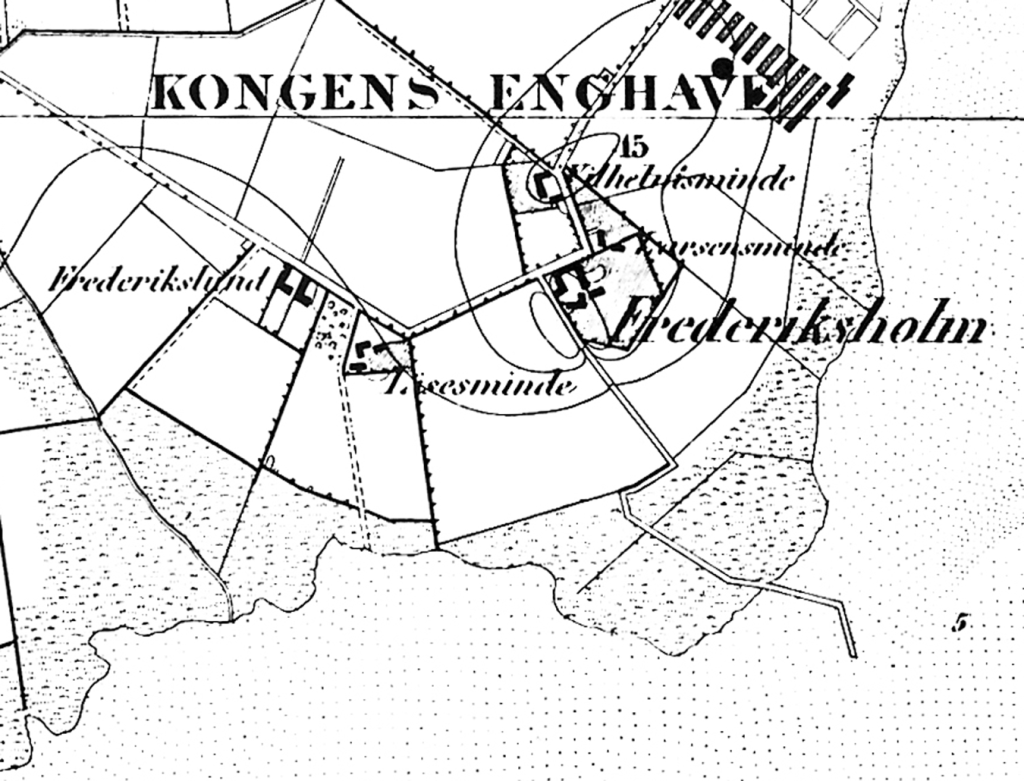
Lisesminde seen in a map detail

In 1795, Kongens Enghave was divided into 22 estates and sold to wealthy citizens from Copenhagen. The estate later known as Karens Minde was registered as No. 22 (cadastral number) in Kongens Enghave, then part of Hvidovre Parish. With an area of just 11 tønder and a half skæppe (1 skæppe land = 690 m2), it was the smallest of the new estates. The estate was known as Lisesminde (Lise's Memory) from at least 1800. It is not clear for whom it was named. The first known owner of the property was the Jewish merchant Abraham Wulf (1739-1815). Wulf's wife was called Hanne Levin.

Wulf went bankrupt. On 31 December 1800, Lisesminde was therefore sold by forced auction. The buyer was the merchant and ship-owner Niels Holbeck. Shortly thereafter, Holbeck sold Lisesminde to mayor Johan Jahn (died 1819). In 1809, Jahn sold Lisesminde to the pharmacist Marx Boye. In 1804, Boye had bought Løve Apotek from Ludvig Manthey. In 1812, he also succeeded Manthey as technical director of the Royal Porcelain Factory.

=== Karens Minde, 1856–1879 ===
After Boye's death, Lisesminde was sold to the wine merchant Jacob Arnkiel (1823-1870). On 19 November 1756, he renamed the property Karens Minde in rememvrance of this maternal grandmother Karen Wancher (née Schmidt). In 1865, he sold it for 10,000 Danish rigsdaler to chamberlain Haagen Valdemar Mathiesen (1812-1897).

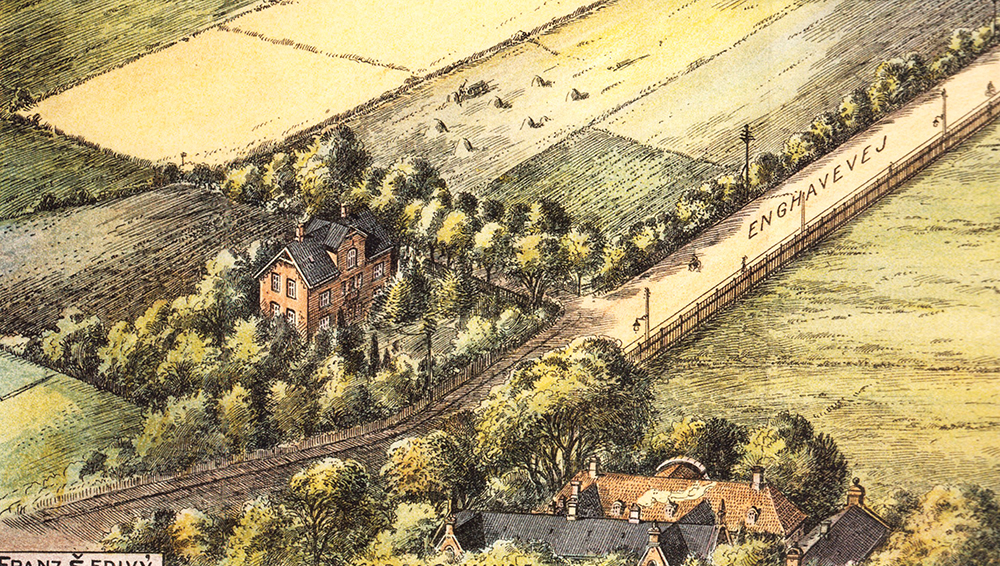
Part of Karens Minde visible in a detail from a bird's Eye view of the area by Franz Sedivy (bottom right corner). The black roof is the old wing. The building behind it is the new wing. The building on the other side of Enghavevej is the now demolished country house Strandholm (demolished in 1934).

In 1879, Karens Minde was acquired by the brothers Vilhelm Køhler and hans yngre bror Johan G. Køhler. A few years earlier, they had also bought one of the other Kongens Enghave estates, Frederiksholm. They had made a fortune on the construction of apartment buildings in the new districts outside Copenhagen's old fortifications (Vesterbro, Nørrebro, Østerbro). This had made them aware of the economic potential in having a large brickworks close to Copenhagen. In 1871, they opened Frederiksholm.

The Jøhler brothers may thus have hoped to find more ressources in the form of clay of chalk for use in their industrial enterprise.

=== Keller's institution ===
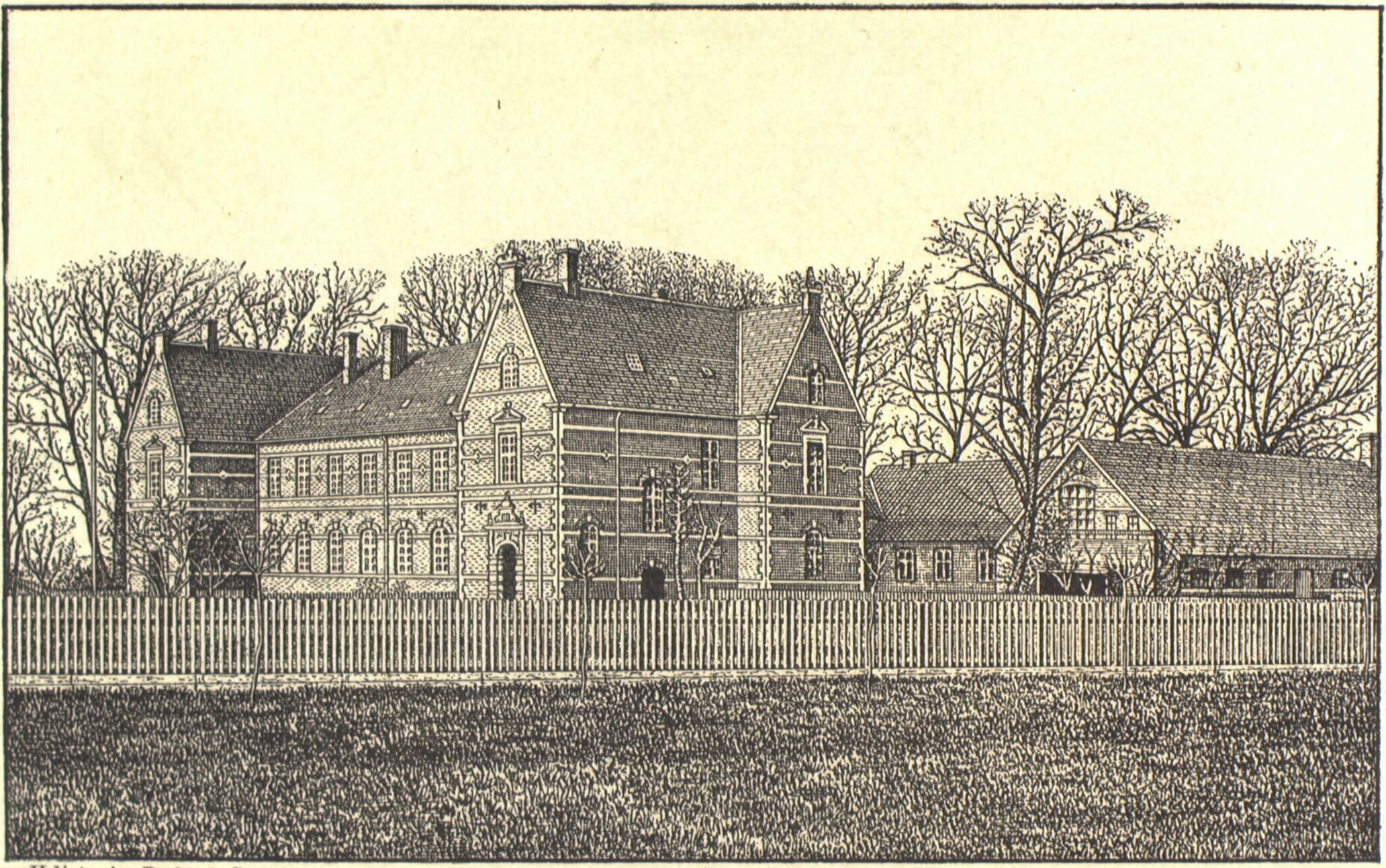
Karens Minde after the extension.

In 1879, Karens Minde was acquired by professor Johan Keller. Keller had recently obtained a large loan from the Danish Parliament with the aim of establishing a mental institution in Copenhagen. Most of the existing buildings were subsequently demolished.

The architect Vilhelm Klein was charged with designing the new building. The new building was completed in 1880. Keller died just four years later. In 1894, his widow ceded Karens Minde to De Kellerske Aandsvageanstalter. The building was expanded in 1914 with the assistance of the architect Einar Thuxen.

In 1949, Karens Minde was expanded with four red-painted wooden buildings. They had previously served as refugee cvamp at Kløvermarken. They provided accommodation for 30 extra residents.

The institution was taken over by the city in 1980. The building was left empty for the next more than ten years. In the first half of the 1990s, it was decided to convert the building into a local cultural centre. It was inaugurated in 1997.

A heritage-listed garden pavilion from Sankt Hans Hospital in Roskilde was moved to the site in 2002. The building was listed on the Danish register of protected buildings and places in 1992. It was possibly designed by Gottlieb Bindesbøll.

== Today ==
Karens Minde houses a public library, café, Kongens Enghave Local Historic Archives and facilities for events for a wide range of cultural events and local associations.

== Karens Minde Aksen ==
The surrounding parkland was redesigned by Schønherr in 2023. Now known as Karens Minde Aksen (Karens Minde Axis). Facilities next to the culture house include a play ground, a children's farm (with horses, sheep, rabbits and alpacas). The greenspace continues as a meandering greenway which connects Eagnersgade to the area on the other side of the railway tracks to the south. The area is also used for rainwater retention in connection with cloudbursts.

== See also ==
- Frederiksberg Åndsvageanstalt
