= Andreas Friis =

Danish painter (1890–1983)

- Born: 21 June 1890; Copenhagen, Denmark
- Died: 16 September 1983 (aged 93); Hillerød, Denmark
- Occupation: Painter

Andreas Alexander Carl Johan Friis (21 June 1890 – 16 September 1983) was a Danish painter. His work was part of the painting event in the art competition at the 1932 Summer Olympics. He was primarily a landscape painter.

== Early life, family and education ==
Friis was born in Copenhagen, June 21, 1890. He was educated at the Royal Danish Academy of Fine Arts from 1910 to 1913.

Later in 1913, he would study with Maurice Denis in Paris. During this time, Friis would become inspired by Cezanne, and Italian Renaissance artists like Michelangelo and Raphael. Friis married Bodil Keller, daughter of Professor Christian Keller of the Keller Institute and Louise Amalie Fick, on 19 June 1918 in Brejning. In 1932, he went to Oslo to study frescoes.

== Career and legacy ==
Friis was a member of the Dutch Free Expedition. Several of his works are in the Bornholm, Vejen, and Ribe museums. At the age of 42, he competed in the 1932 Olympics painting event with Riders in The Forest. Friis did not place.
