= Christian Keller (physician) =

Danish physician (1858–1934)

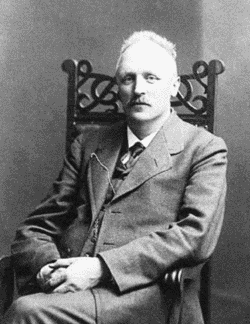
- Christian Keller 1890 published by the Malling-Hansen Society
- Born: 29 October 1858; Copenhagen, Denmark
- Died: 8 June 1934 (aged 75); Copenhagen, Denmark
- Citizenship: Danish
- Occupation: Professor (1892)
- Medical career
- Profession: Physician
- Awards: Order of the Dannebrog (1905); Order of the Polar Star (1932); Medal of Merit (1932)

Christian Keller (29 October 1858 – 8 June 1934) was a Danish physician and honorary professor who pioneered and expanded the state-supported Danish care system for the intellectually disabled ("åndssvagevæsen") (Note: This was a term in general use during the late 19th and early 20th centuries, which is now considered unacceptable in modern day use.) in the late 19th and early 20th centuries.

== Early life, family and education ==
Keller was born in Helliånds parish, Copenhagen in 1858. He was the second son of Professor Johan Keller and Cathrine Graae. He graduated from the Borgerdyd School in Copenhagen in 1875 and received his medical degree in 1883. He worked as an assistant doctor at the Oringe and Frederiksberg Hospital in 1883.

== Career ==
Keller worked at the Frederiksberg Hospital from 1883–84 before he became the director and chief physician at the Keller Institution for the Mentally Deficient, which was founded by his father in 1867. He was a member of the commission for the reorganisation of institutions for the mentally disabled in 1886 and part of the commission on the organisation of Danish services for individuals that were deaf-mute and the mentally deficient in 1888. This work influenced the Danish Parliament, which led to a law being passed on 26 March 1898 called "Lov om det statsunderstøttede åndssvagevæsen", which came with a financial grant that enabled a new institution for the mentally disabled to be founded at Brejning by Vejle Fjord in Jutland in 1899. He also planned and oversaw the construction of further institutions at Livø for antisocial or criminal men in 1911 and Sprogø for morally deficient or antisocial women in 1923.

== Publications ==
Keller wrote numerous articles and publications between 1870 and 1926 relating to the care of people with intellectual disabilities:

- 1870 – De Kellerske Aandssvage-Anstalter.
- 1989 – Den antisociale Aandssvages Internering.
- 1899 – Sinken og den Aandssvage. En Grænseregulering.
- 1901 – Det danske Aandssvagevæsen.
- 1901 – De danske Aandssvage-Anstalter.
- 1902 – Den aandsvage forbryder.
- 1903 – Om Forholdet mellem Aandssvage- og Sindssyge-anstalter.
- 1905 – Aandssvaghed.
- 1906 – Den Aandssvages Kønsløsgørelse.
- 1906 – Lægen og Pædagogen i Aandssvageanstalternes Tjeneste.
- 1909 – Nyere Forsøg paa en metodisk Inddeling af Aandssvaghed.
- 1910 – Forstandsprøver.
- 1910 – Intelligens-Prøverne.
- 1911 – Aandssvage uden Forstandsmangel.
- 1911 – Atter Binets Forstandsprøver.
- 1913 – Den eugeniske Bevægelse.
- 1915 – Binet's Forstandsprøver atter bedømt af sagkyndig Kritiker.
- 1917 – Hvad kan der gøres for at forringe de Aandssvages Tal?
- 1922 – Racehygiejniske Slægts-Undersøgelser.
- 1926 – Dansk Aandssvageforsorg.
- 1930 – Johan Keller 1830-1930.

== Honours ==
Keller received several awards and honours for his work:

- Appointed titular professor in 1892.
- (R) Knight of the Order of Dannebrog in 1905.
- (DM) The Cross of Honour of the Order of Dannebrog in 1915.
- (S.V.22) The Silver Cross of Honour of the Order of Dannebrog in 1920.
- (K²) Commander of the Order of the Dannebrog in 1928.
- (N.St.O.22) Order of the Polar Star in 1932.
- (F.M.1) Medal of Merit in Gold in 1932.

== Personal life ==
Christian Keller married Louise Amalie Fick (20 July 1857 – 25 Jun 1935) in Vordingborg on 10 January 1885. They had four children:

1. Ella Keller (11 June 1886 – 28 Apr 1960), married Julius Pedersen Brønsted.
2. Axel Keller (3 May 1888 – 26 December 1972), married Elsa Helene Herrmann.
3. Otto Keller (19 January 1890 – 19 June 1975), doctor and chief surgeon married Anna Mary Rée.
4. Bodil Keller (26 June 1893 – 20 March 1981), music teacher married Andreas Alexander Carl Johan Friis, a Danish painter.
