= Julius Folkmann =

Danish photographer, cinematographer and painter

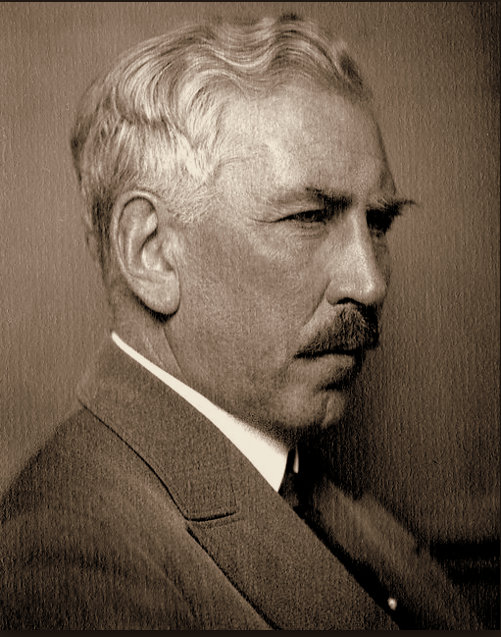
- Born: 24 December 1864; Rønne, Bornholm
- Died: 28 January 1948 (aged 83); Søllerød, Denmark
- Occupation: Photographer

Julius Doris Folkmann (24 December 1864 - 29 January 1948) was a Danish photographer. He was chairman of Dansk Fotografisk Forening in 1921–1040. He also worked as a cinematographer on a few films in the early 1910s.

== Early life and education ==
Folkmann was born on 24 December 1864 in Rønne on Bornholm, the son of miller Hans Peter Folkmann (1828–1918) and Cecilie Holm (1824–1908). He was educated as a painter and exhibited at Charlottenborg in 1890.

== Career ==
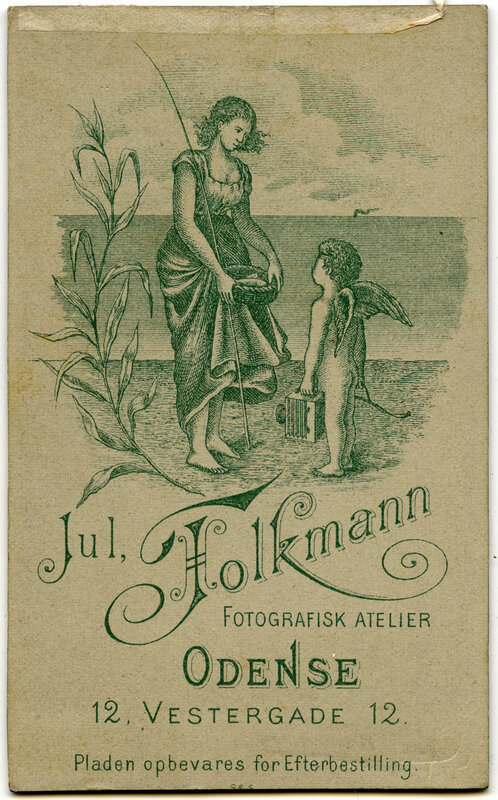
Ad for Julius Folkmann's photographic studio at Vestergade 12 in Odense

Folkmann established a photographic studio in Copenhagen in 1887. He moved to Odense in 1784. His studio was based at Vestergade 21 and he became a board member of the Funen Photographers' Association. During his years on Funen, he focused on genre and landscape photography. His photographs reached a large audience through reproductions in Frem, Illustreret Tidende, Illustreret Familie Journal, Hver 8. Dag, Die weite Welt and Die Woche.

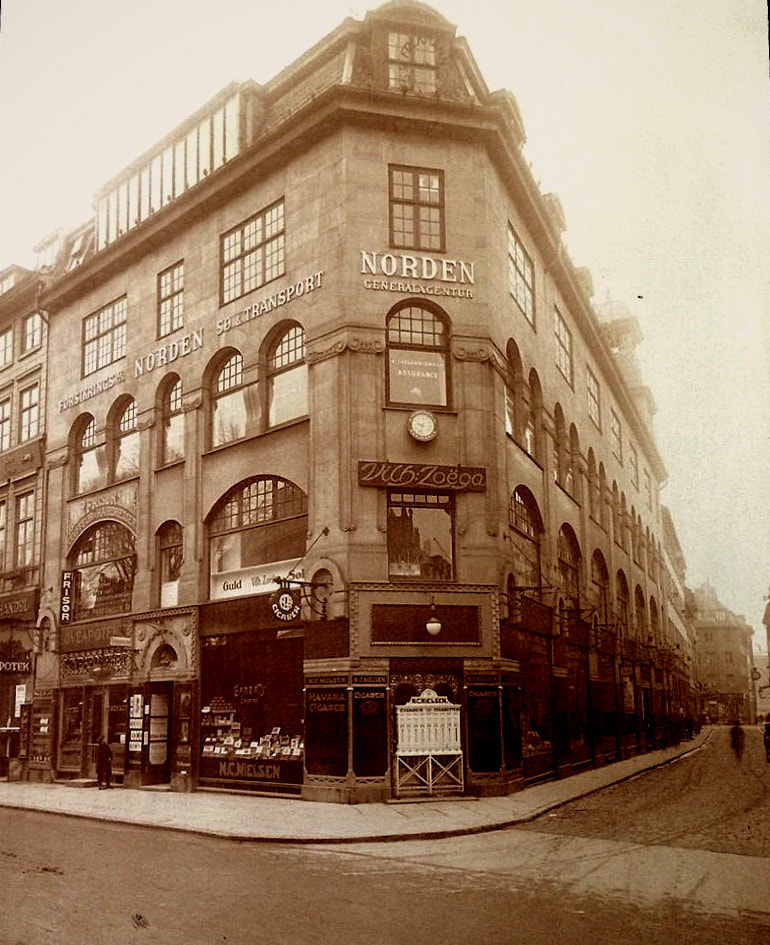
Amagertorv 33

Folkmann returned to Copenhagen in 1910, He also worked as a cinematographer on a few films directed by Vilhelm Glückstadt in 1911-13 and took over Frederik Riise's former photographic studio at Amagertorv 33 in 1914. He became a popular portrait photographer.

Folkmann was for the first time elected for the board of Dansk Fotografisk Forening in 1912. He was the following year elected as vice chairman and succeeded Johannes Hauerslev as chairman in 1921- 1940. He played a central role in the foundation of association's school of photography in 1016 and served as its first leader from 1916 to 1921 and again from 1934 to 1944. He was in 1934 made an honorary member of the association and had by then already been appointed as honorary member of its counterparts in Norway and Sweden.

== Personal life ==
Folkmann married the Scanian Hilda Andersson (16 August 1862 - 12 December 1928), a daughter of the farmer Anders Anderson and Sophia Sjönström on 26 September 1890 in St. John's Church in Nørrebro. He was after her early death in 1928 married to her half sister Anna Matilda Anderberg (born 6 February 1894) on 23 November 1936 in Søllerød Church.

Folkmann was created a Knight in the Order of the Dannebrog in 1923. He died on 29 January 1948 and is buried in Søllerød Cemetery.

== Filmography ==
Folkmann worked on the following films:.

=== Short film ===
- De Fire (1911)

=== Feature films ===
- Slægten (191)
- Det blaa Blod (1912)
- Haanden, der griber (1913)
- De Dødes Ø (1913)

== Gallery ==
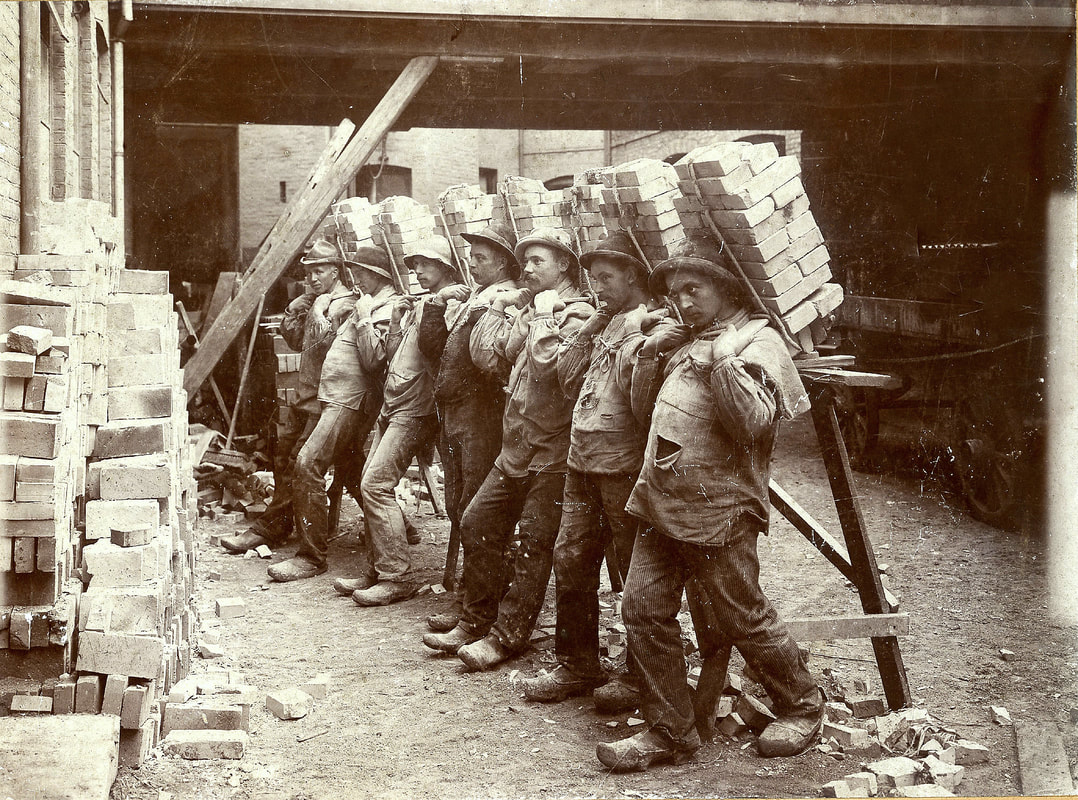
Odense brickyard workers

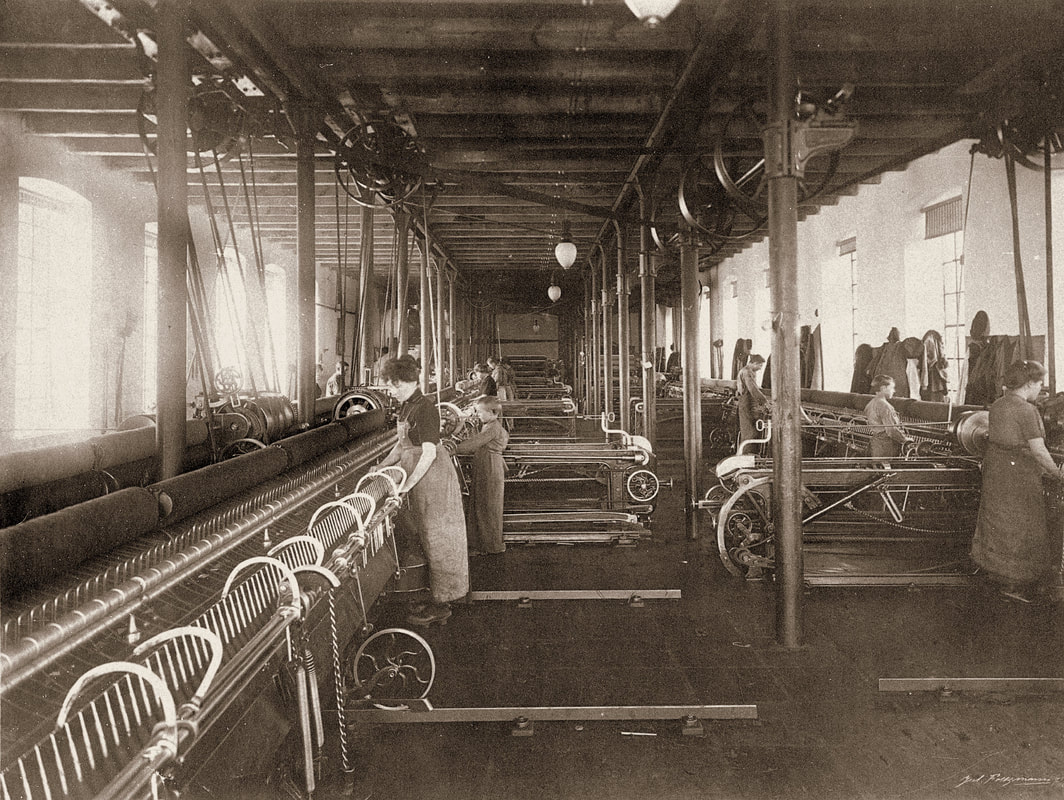
Brandt's Textile Factory in Odense, c. 1920
