= Johan Frederik Vilhelm Schlegel =

Danish jurist (1765-1836)

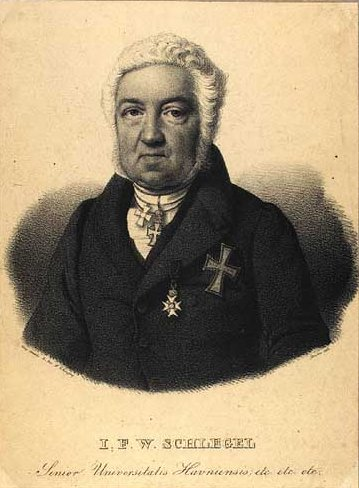

Johan Frederik (Friderich) Wilhelm Schlegel (4 October 1765 – 19 July 1836) was a Danish jurist. He was an extraordinary professor at the University of Copenhagen from 1789 and ordinary professor from 1800.

== Early life and education ==
Schlegel was born in Copenhagen, the son of Johan Heinrich Schlegel (1726–80) and Augusta A. v. Jessen (1747–1821). In 1786, he obtained a travel grant from Fonden ad usus publicos and spent several years at German universities. In 1787, he received a distinction (accessit ) at the University of Göttingen for the dissertation De eo, quod justum est circa emigrationem civium. He then spent a few months in England.

== Career ==
In 1788, Schlegel returned to compete for a vacant professorial chair. It went to C. M. T. Cold but Schlegel was next spring employed as adjunct at the Department of Law. Later that same year he was appointed as an extraordinary professor and in 1800 and ordinary professor.

== Personal life ==
Schlegel married Marie Elisabeth Hellfried (1773-1851(, a daughter of County Governor Johan Carl Frederik Hellfried (1739–1810) and Frederikke Vilhelmine v. Jessen (1749–1817), on 17 May 1793 in St. Nicolas' Church in Copenhagen.

In 1703, Schlegel acquired the country house Sindshvile in Frederiksberg. He purchased the estate Falkensteen at Slagelse in 1811 but already next year ceded it to Ludvig Manthey in exchange for Søllerødgaard in Søllerød north of Copenhagen. He died at Søllerødgaard on 19 July 1836 and is buried in Søllerød Cemetery.

Academic offices
Preceded by Friedrich Münter	Rector of University of Copenhagen; 1823–1824	Succeeded by Nicolai Christoffer Kall
