= Falkensteen =

Manor house five kilometres south of Slagelse, Denmark

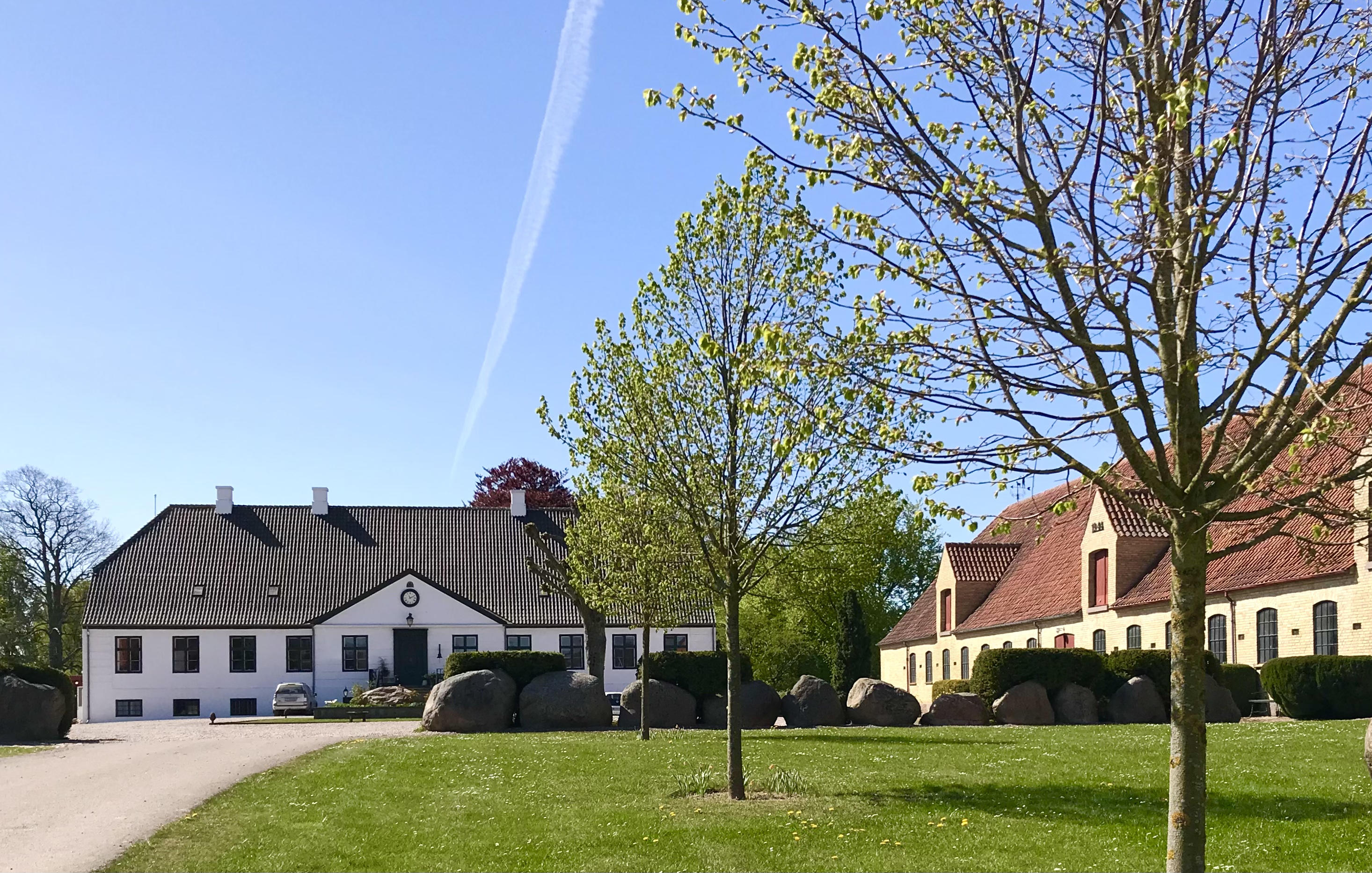
- Falkensteenvej 20; 4200 Slagelse
- Interactive map of the Falkensteen area

General information
- Architectural style: Neoclassical
- Location: Slagelse Municipality, Falkensteenvej 20, 4200 Slagelse, Denmark
- Coordinates: 55°21′28.23″N 11°22′2.69″E
- Completed: 1775

Falkensteen is a manor house located five kilometres south of Slagelse, Denmark. The current Neoclassical main building was built for Georg Frederik Ditlev Koës in 1775. It was listed on the Danish registry of protected buildings and places in 1950. A half-timbered barn from 1864 is also listed.

== History ==
=== Pebringegaard ===
The estate was originally called Pebringegaard. The old name is first recorded in 1372 when Clemend Senæ granted it to Antvorskov Abbey. It was later owned by the Hvass family. Niels Hvas is mentioned as the owner in 1404. It was later acquired by the crown. Lauritz Nielsen was lensmann from 1642. The main building was destroyed in a fire in 1648. In 1663, it was acquired by Jens Ebbesen, the bailiff of Antvorskov, but after a while reverted to the crown. In 1674, Christian V granted it to Henrik Thott. It later went to his daughter, Sophie Thott. In 1675, she gave it to Hans Carstensøn. It was then most likely reacquired by its former owner, Jens Ebbesen, since his widow in 1698 sold it to Frederik von Korff.

In 1705, Frederik IV used a buy-back clause to reacquire the estate. In 1717, it was included in Antvorskov Cavalry District.

=== Just Ludvigsen and his family ===
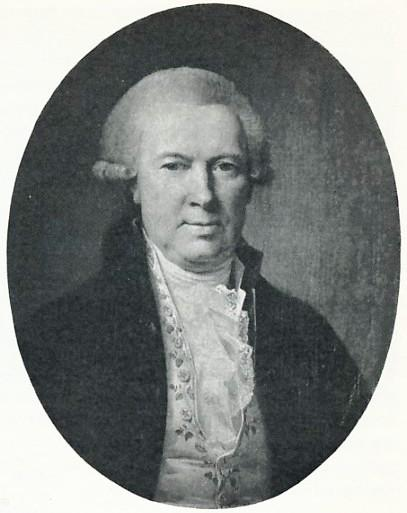
Georg Frederik Ditlev Koës painted by Jens Juel

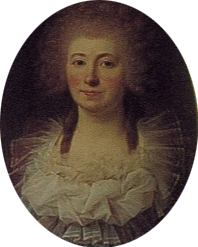
Anna Methea, née Falch (1757-1792)-modified.

In 1774, Antvorskov and Pebringegaard were acquired by Georg Ditlev Frederik Köes. He renamed Pebringegaard Falkensteen after his wife, Anna Mathea Falck. Koës was originally from Preussia but had later moved to Copenhagen where he established a lottery (tallotteriet).

In 1794, Koës chose to sell his Danish estates to Magnus von Dernath. In 1799, he sold Falkensteen to Constantin Brun, a wealthy merchant from Copenhagen.

=== 19th century ===
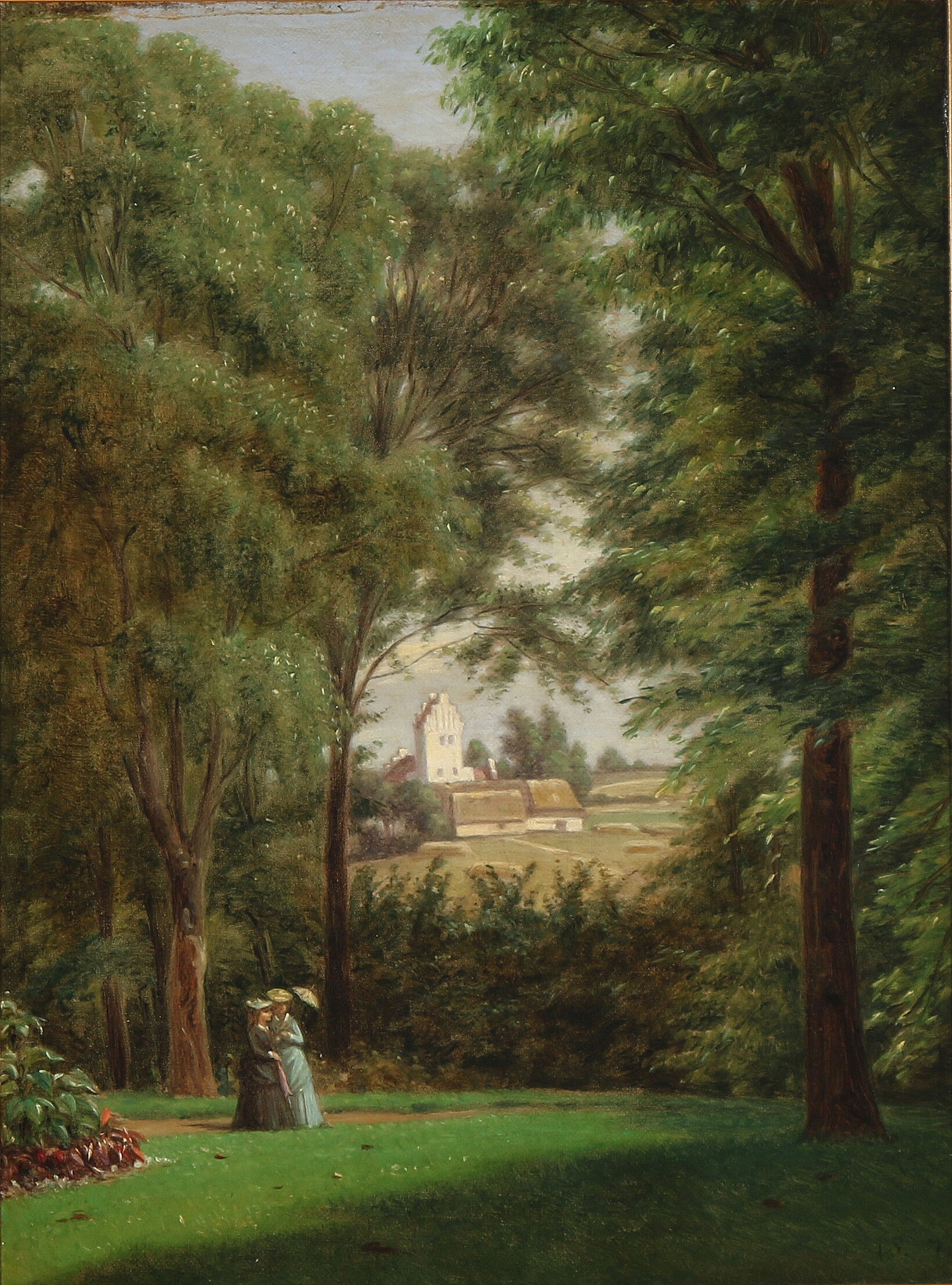
Jørgen Sonne. The garden at Falkensteen, looking towards Sludserup Church, 1879.

In 1806, Brun sold the estate to Adam Wilhelm Hauch and Marcus Frederik Voigt.

In 1809 it was acquired by Marcus Bech. In 1811, he sold it to professor of law at the University of Copenhagen Johan Frederik Vilhelm Schlegel who next year ceded it to Ludvig Manthey in exchange for Søllerødgaard in Søllerød north of Copenhagen. Manthey had recently given up his positions as director of the Royal Porcelain Manufactory and manager of Ørholm and Brede Works. He kept the estate until his death in 1842 and was buried in the local Gerlev Cemetery.

Falkensteen was then acquired by Lars Trolle, who in 1846 ceded it to Peter Adolf Henrik Stampe. In 1852, Falkensteen was acquired by Jacob Jacobsen.

=== 20th and 21st centuries ===
In 1897, Jacobsen's heirs sold Falkensteen to Frederik Wilhelm Treschow. Treschow sold it when he inherited Brahesborg on Funen after his father in 1811. The new owner was Carl A. N. Lawaetz. The estate has since then remained in the hands of the Lawaetz family.

== Architecture ==
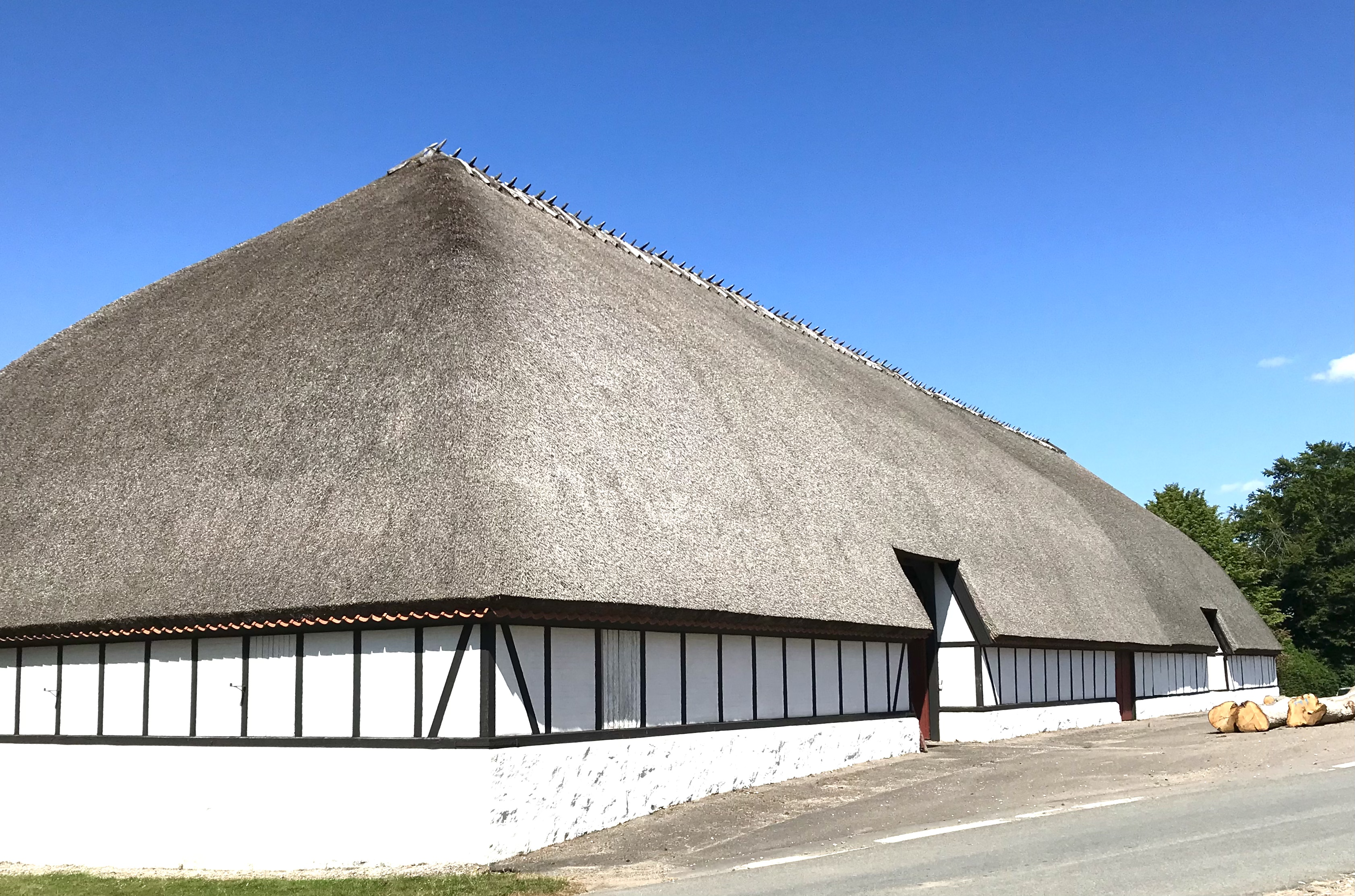
Barn at Falkensteen

The main building is from 1775 and was built with brick from Antvorskov Abbey. The rather unassuming, single-storey building is 11 bays long and has a hipped red tile roof. The facade features a median risalit tipped by a triangular pediment.

== List of owners ==
- ( –1372) Clemend Senæ
- (1372– )Antvorskov Abbey
- ( – ) Slægten Hvas
- (1404) Niels Hvas
- ( –1663) The Crown
- (1663–1674) Jens Ebbesen
- (1674–1675) Henrik Thott
- (1675–1676) Sophie Thott
- (1676– ) Hans Carstensøn
- ( – ) Jens Ebbesen
- ( –1698) Catherina Jørgensdatter, gift Ebbesen
- (1698–1705) Frederik von Korff
- (1705–1774) The Crown
- (1774–1794) Georg Frederik Ditlev Koës
- (1794–1799) Magnus von Dernath
- (1799–1806) Constantin Brun
- (1806–1809) Adam Wilhelm Hauch
- (1806–1809) Marcus Frederik Voigt
- (1809–1811) Marcus Bech
- (1811–1812) Johan Frederik Vilhelm Schlegel
- (1812–1842) Ludvig Manthey
- (1842) The estate of Ludvig Manthey
- (1842–1846) Lars Trolle
- (1846–1852) Peter Adolf Henrik Stampe
- (1852–1893) Jacob Jacobsen
- (1893–1897) Otto Moltke
- (1893–1897) Peter Bruun de Neergaard
- (1897–1911) Frederik Wilhelm Treschow
- (1911–1933) Carl Anton Nicolaj Lawaetz
- (1933– ) Aage Lawaetz
- (2013– ) Carl Aage Lawaetz
