= Frederik Riise =

Danish photographer

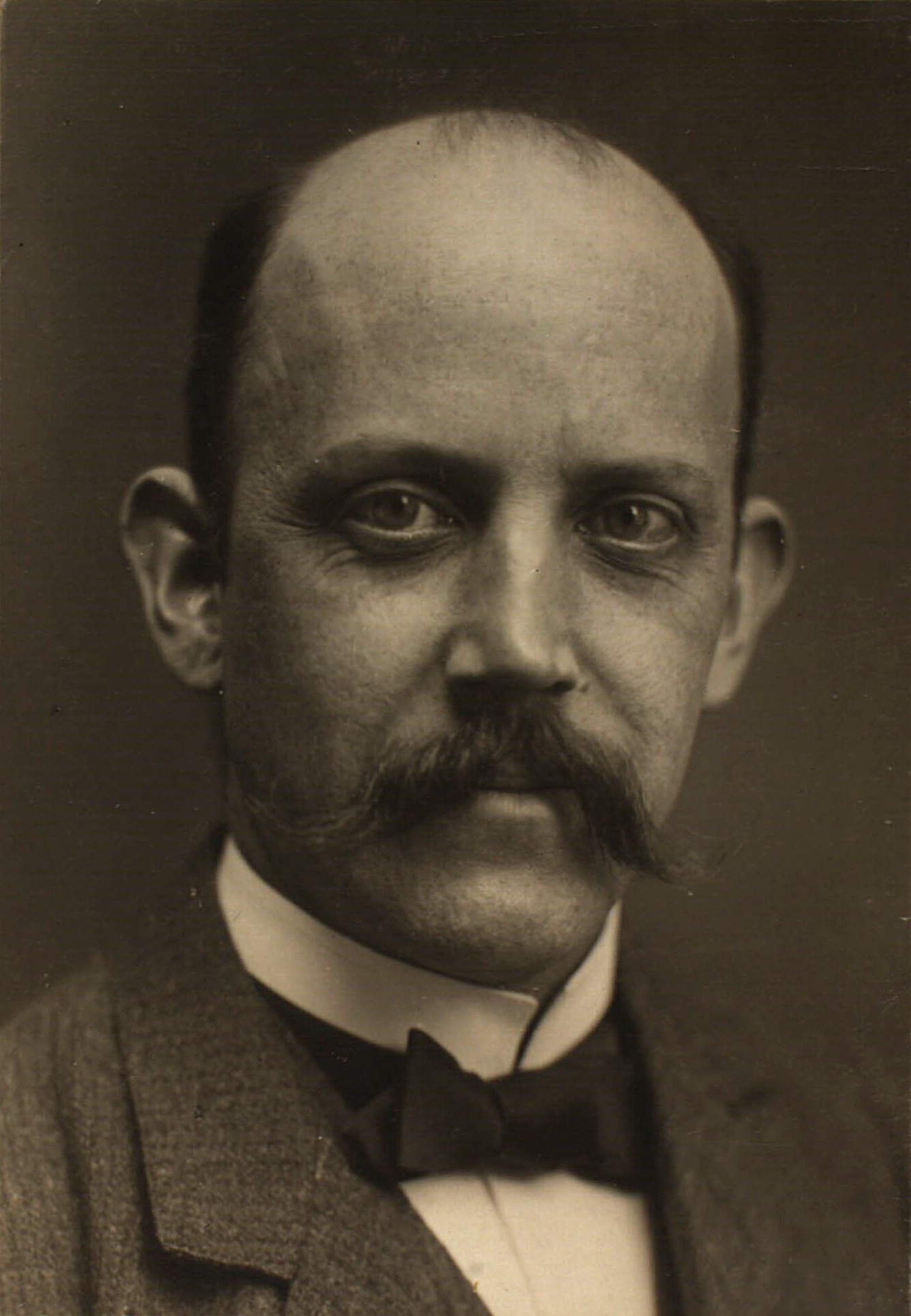
- Frederik Riise c. 1900
- Born: 8 December 1863; St. Thomas, Danish West Indies,
- Died: 11 January 1933 (aged 69); Gentofte, Denmark
- Other name: F. Riise
- Occupation: Photographer

Frederik Riise (8 December 1863 – 11 January 1933) was a Danish photographer and exhibition curator. He was a noted portrait photographer and is also remembered for his numerous photographs of buildings, streets and monuments in Copenhagen.

== Early life and education ==
Riise was born on 8 December 1863 on Saint Thomas in the Danish West Indies, the son of pharmacist Albert Heinrich Riise (1810–82) and Henriette M. Worm (1821–89). He enrolled at the University of Copenhagen where he studied Zoology but discontinued his studies to take over his brother's photographic studio in Copenhagen.

== Photographic studio ==
Riise's elder brother Harald Riise (17 October 1856 – 14 January 1892) trained as a photographer and travelled to Australia by way of London in circa 1881, settling in H Hobart where he opened a photographic studio in a partnership with Henry Walter Barnett.. He returned to Denmark in 1885 where he opened a photographic studio at Amagertorv 6. He was later hit by mental illness and hospitalized at Sankt Hans Hospital. The photographic studio was from 1888 continued by Frederik Riise, initially under the name H. Riises Eftfølger (H. Riise's Successor) but after approximately a year under his own name. The studio relocated to Vimmelskaftet 42 in 1897 and was from 1909 to 1913 located at Amagertorv 33.

== Other activities ==
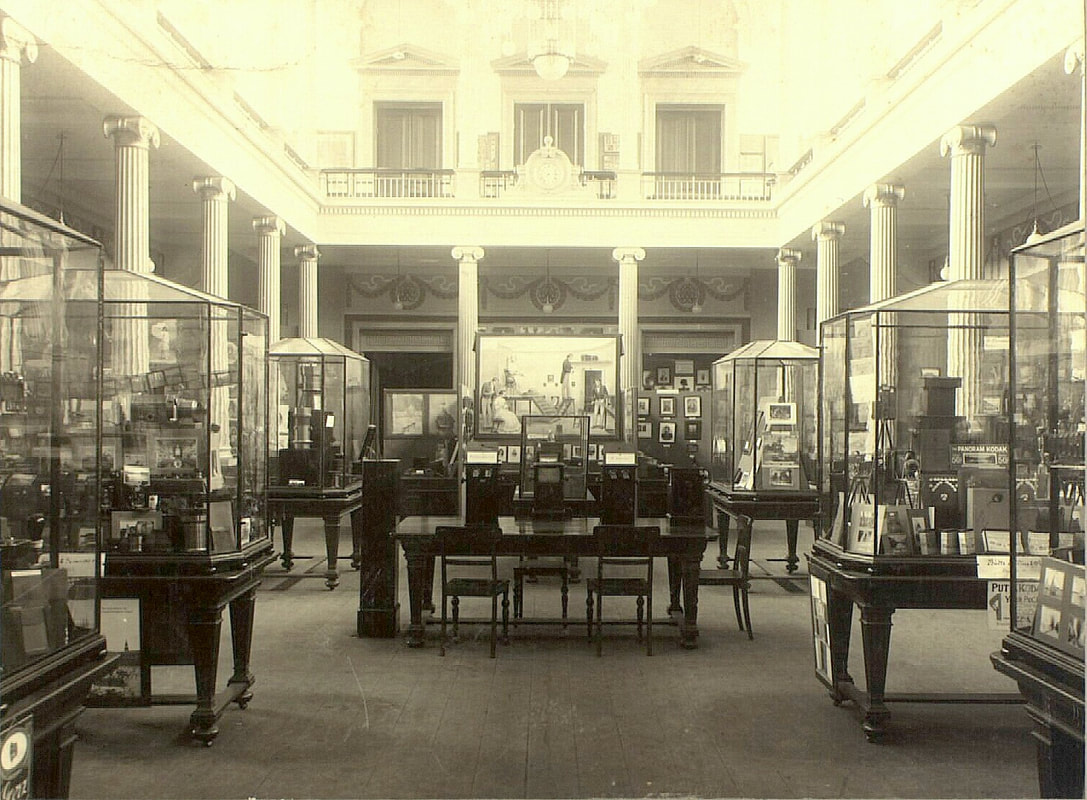
Riise at the 1888 Nordic Exhibition in Copenhagen.

Riise was a board member of Dansk fotografisk forening from 1891 to 1996 and for some of the time served as vice president of the association. He was a board member of Industriforeningen in 1907–16. This introduced him to the work with arranging exhibitions. He was a commissioner at the 1913 Agricultural Exhibition in Landskrona, the 1014 Baltic Exhibition in Malmö. the 1922 World Expo in Rio de Janeiro and the 1925 International Exhibition of Modern Decorative and Industrial Arts in Paris.

Riise served as exspector at the lazaret camp for prisoners of war at Hald in 1917–18.

In 1911 he was elected as president of the Historical-Technical Society and worked for the creation of a collection of historical technical instruments and devices. Part of the collection was later included in the collections of the Danish Technical Museum in Helsingør.

== Personal life ==
Riise married Anna Dorothea Christine Westergaard (23 November 186 – 29 July 1939), a daughter of civil servant Christian Jørgensen Worm (1824–94) and Anna Rebecca Martine Elisabeth Bille (1831–89), on 5 April 1889 in the Church of Holmen. They divorced in 1912.

Riise was created a Knight in the Order of the Dannebrog in 1914. He died on 11 January 1933 in Gentofte and is buried at Solbjerg Park Cemetery in Frederiksberg.

== Gallery ==
=== Copenhagen ===
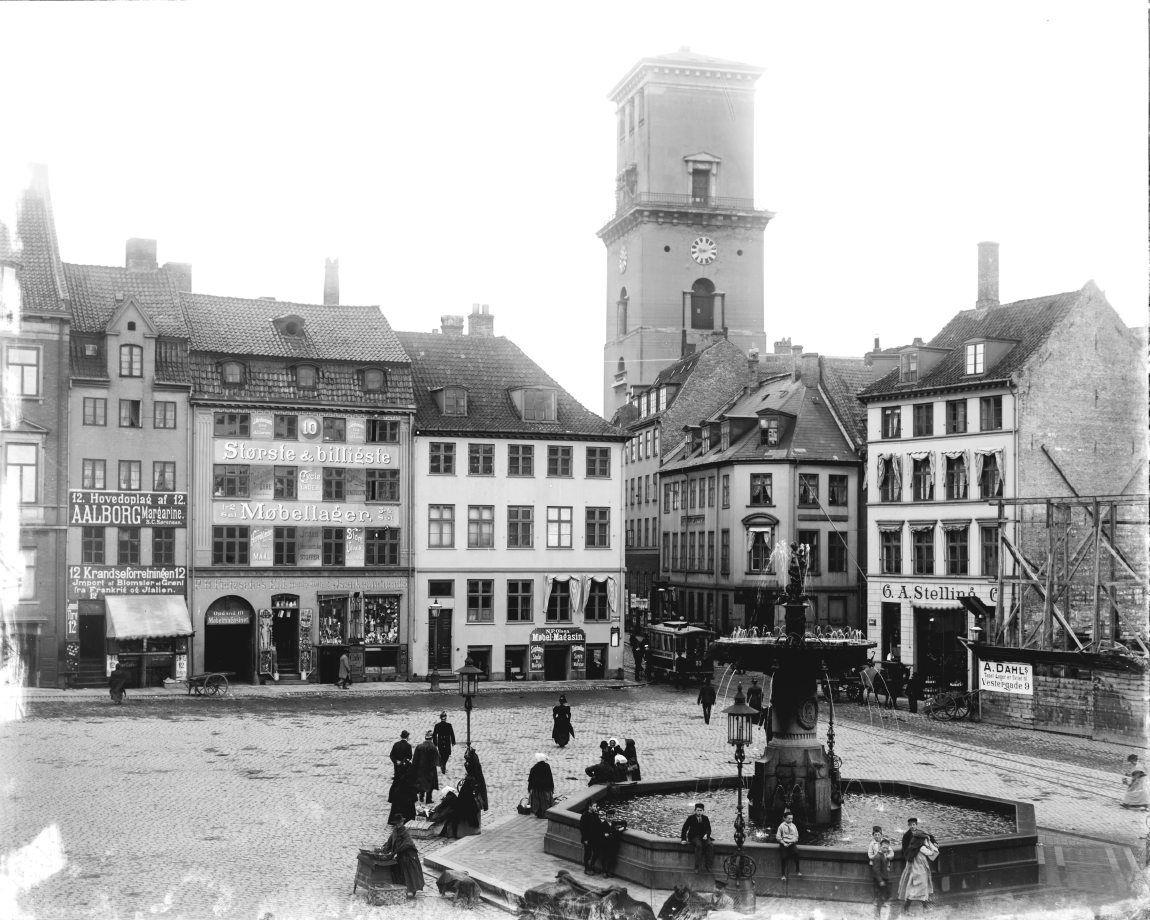
Gammeltorv

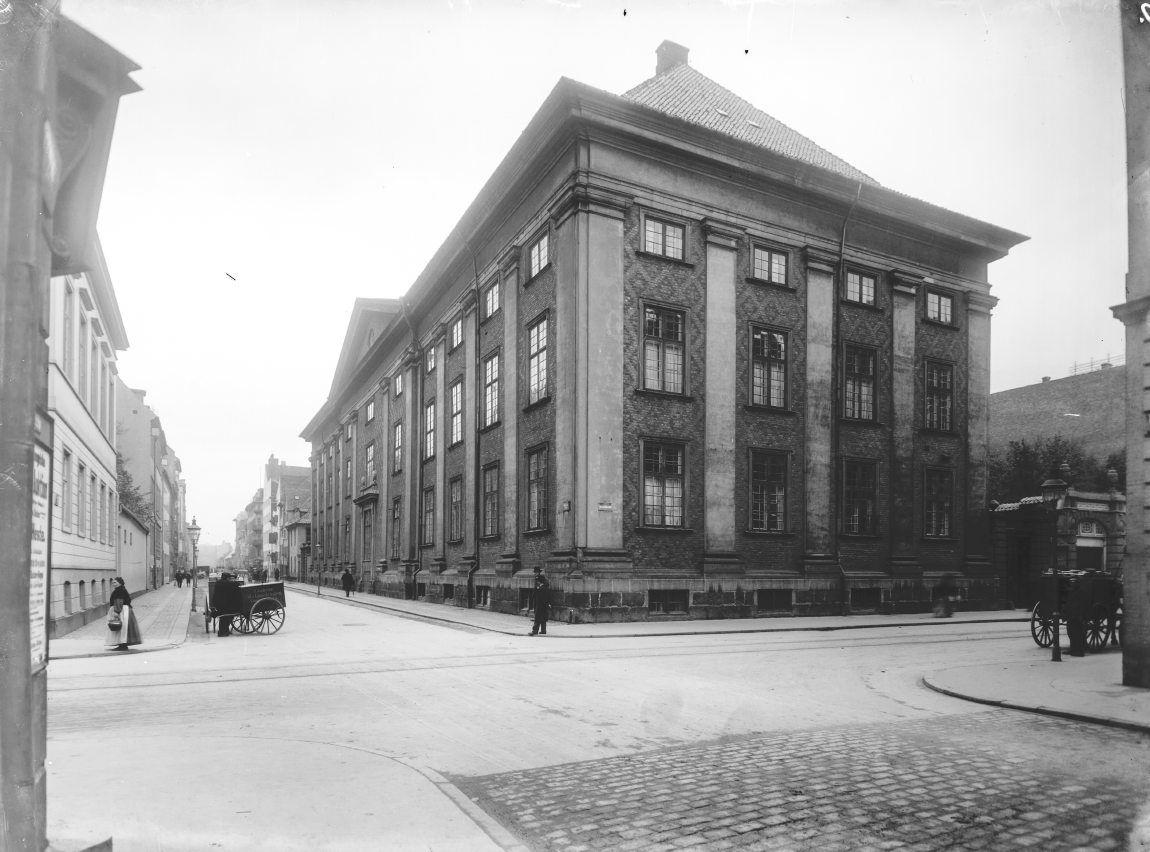
Østre Landsret

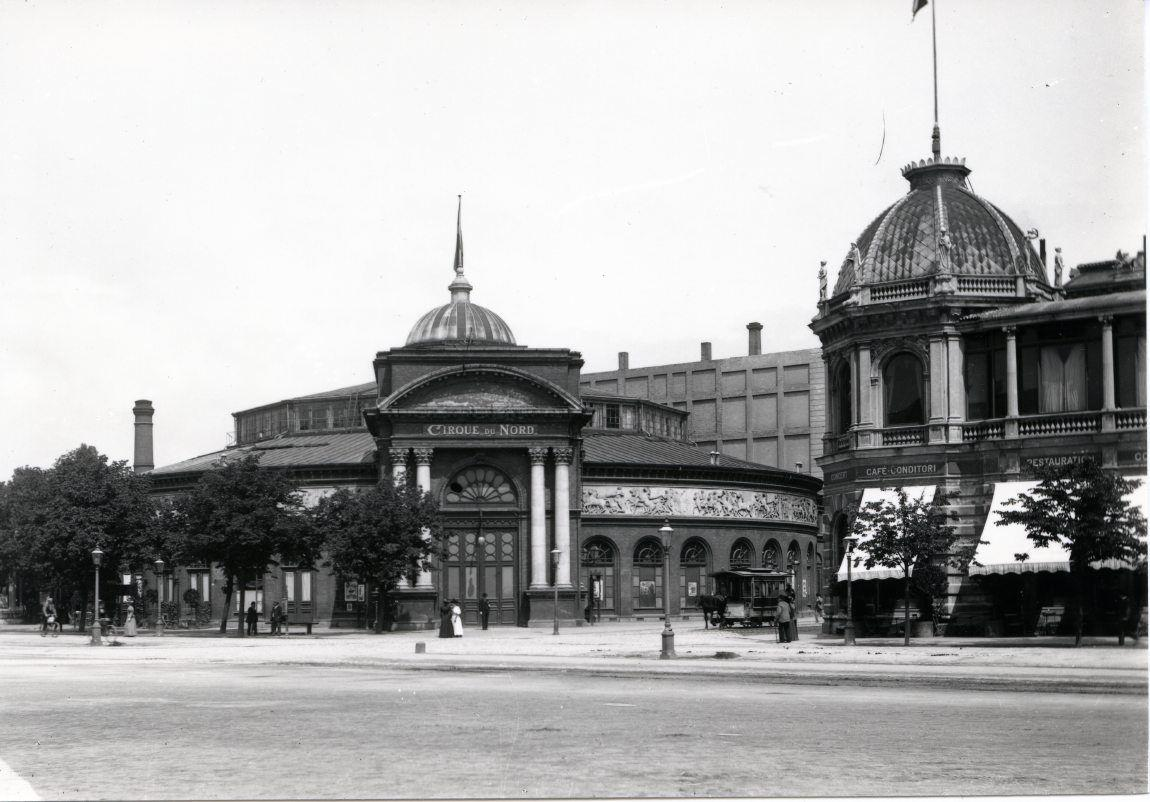
Circus Building

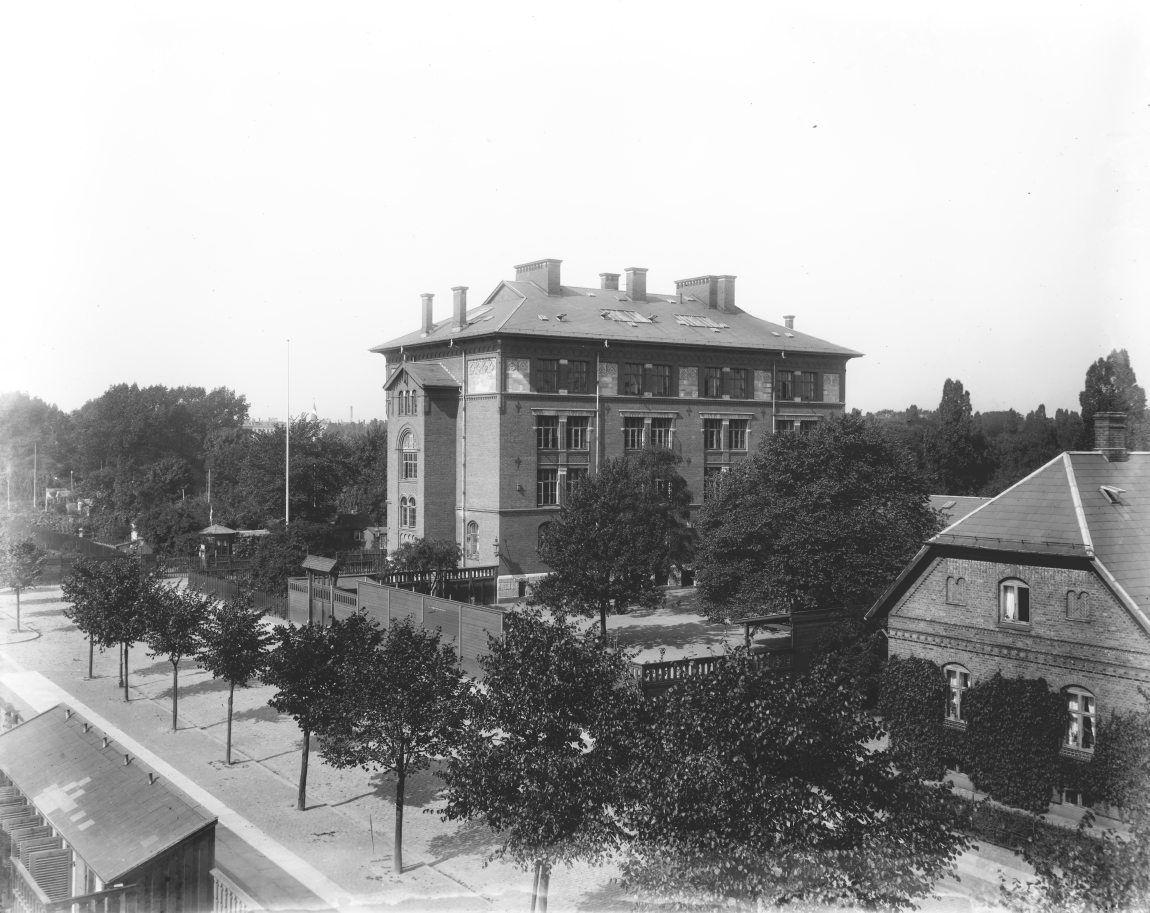
Hans Tavsens Gade

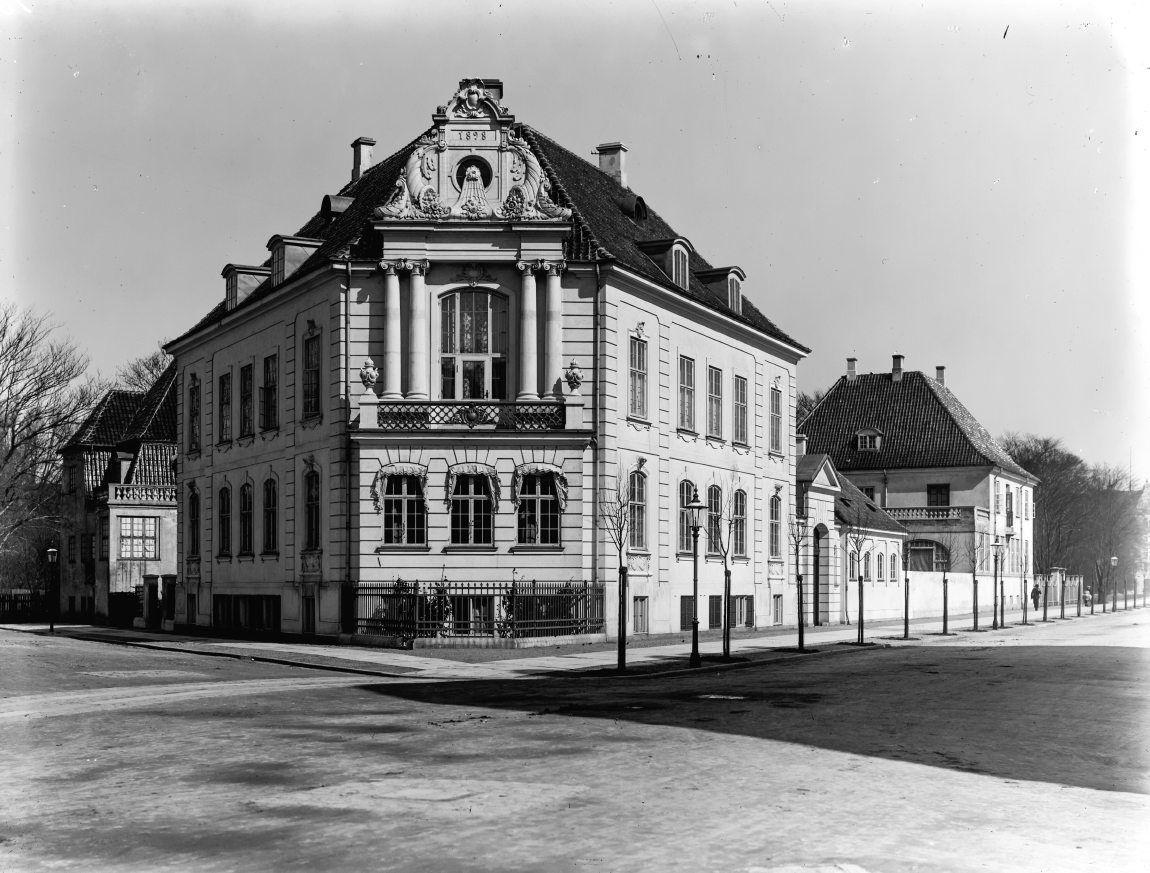
Emil Vett House

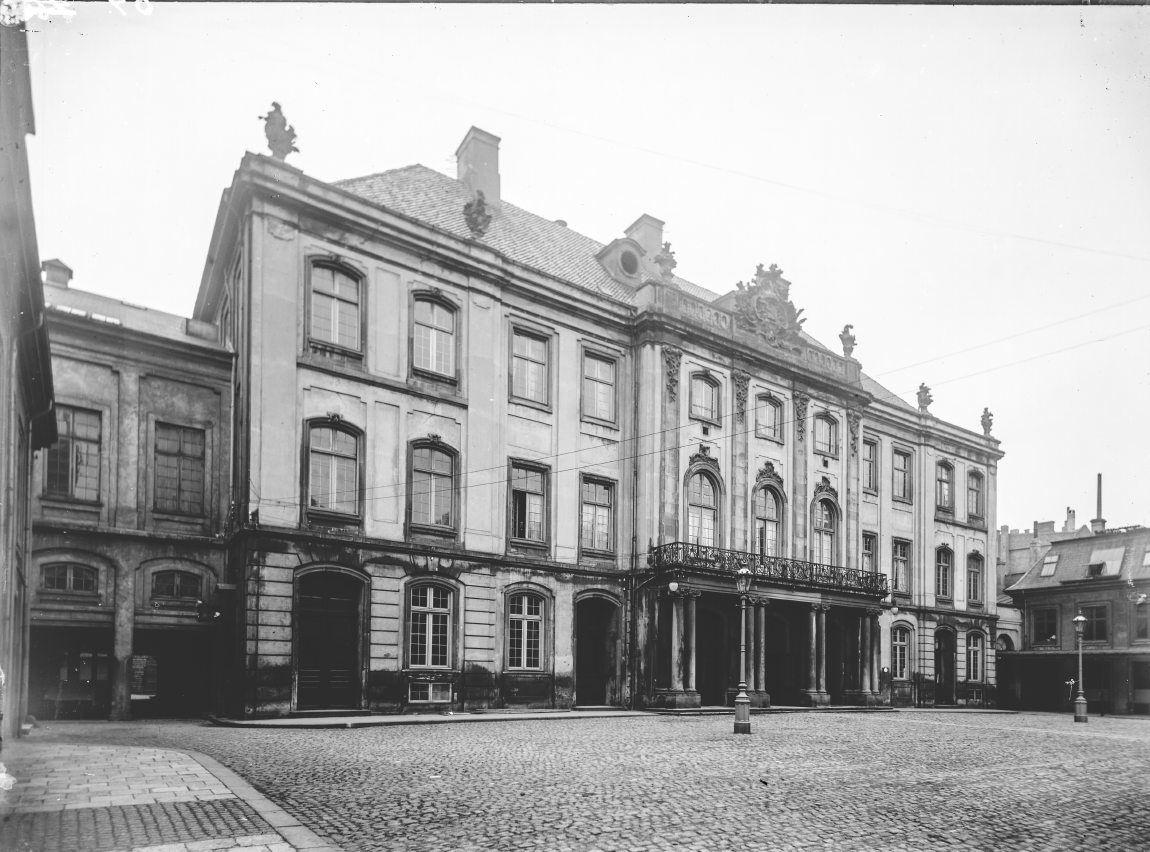
Koncertpalæet

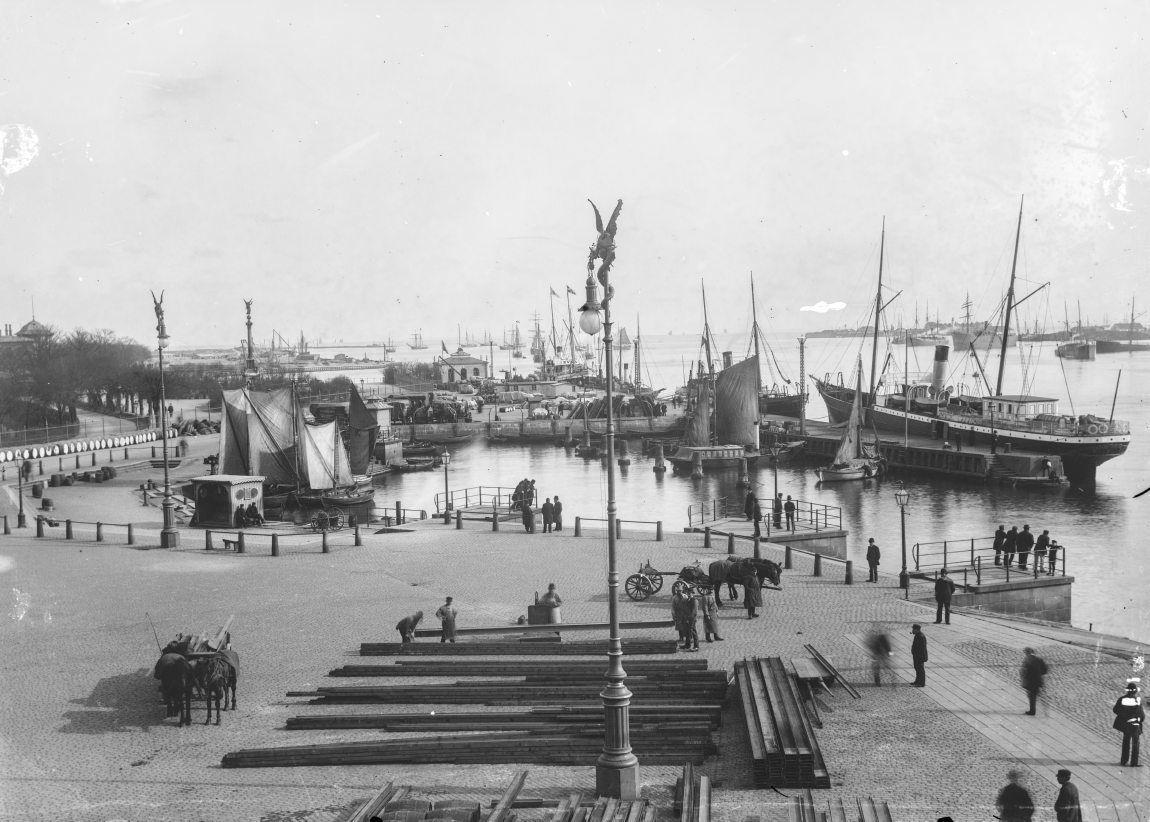
Nordre Toldbod

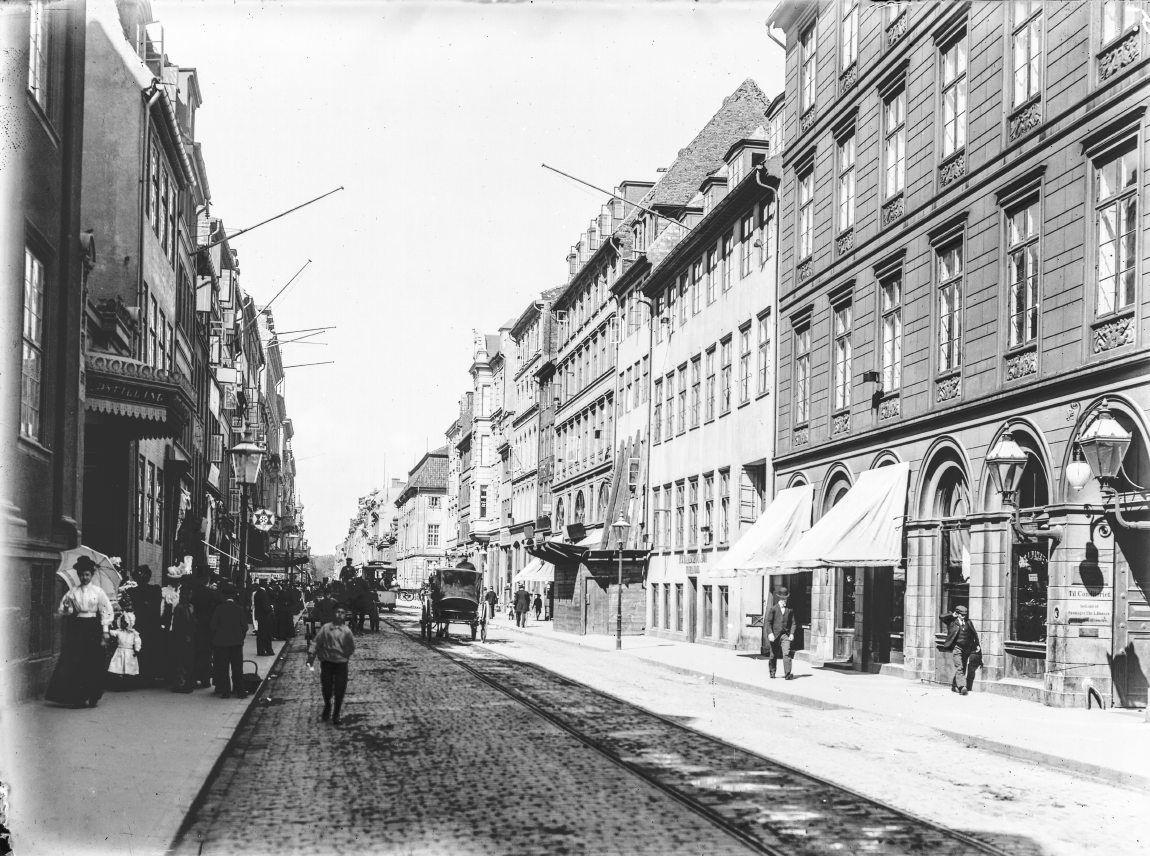
Bredgade

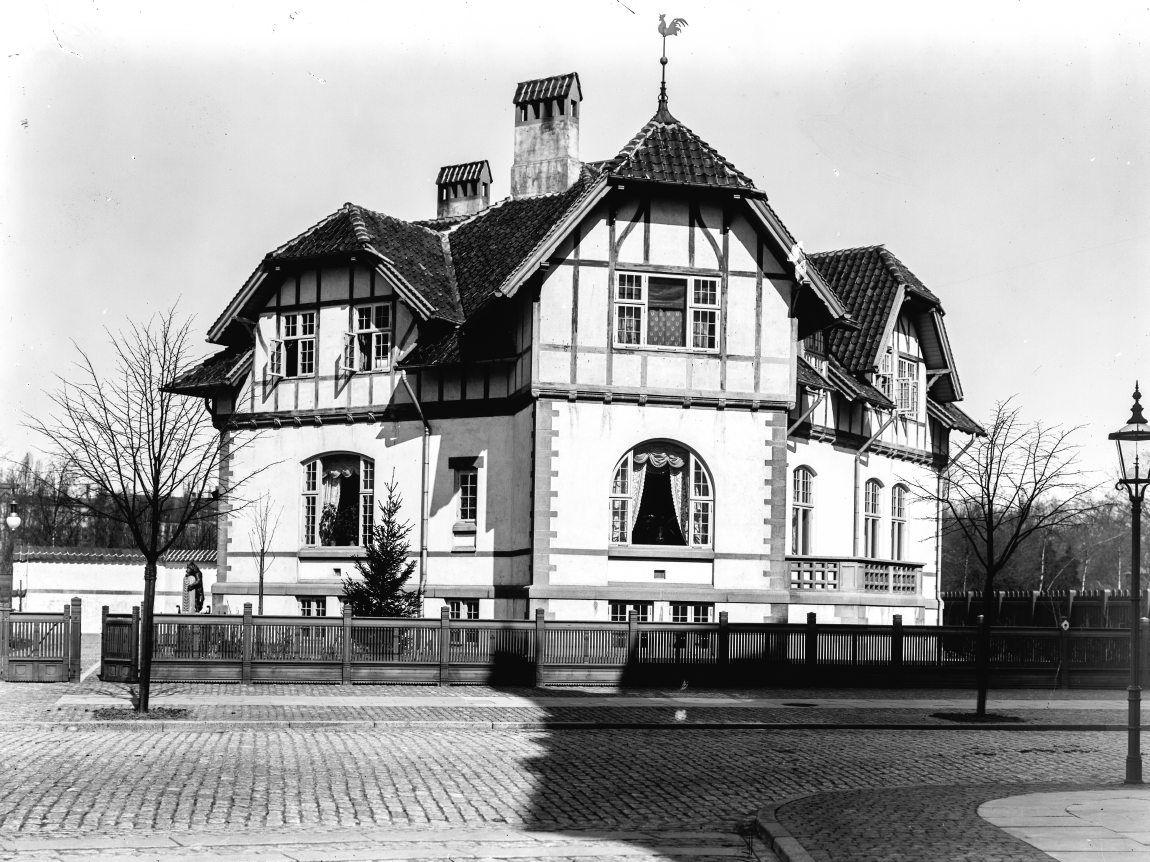
Stockholms Plads 7

=== Portraits ===
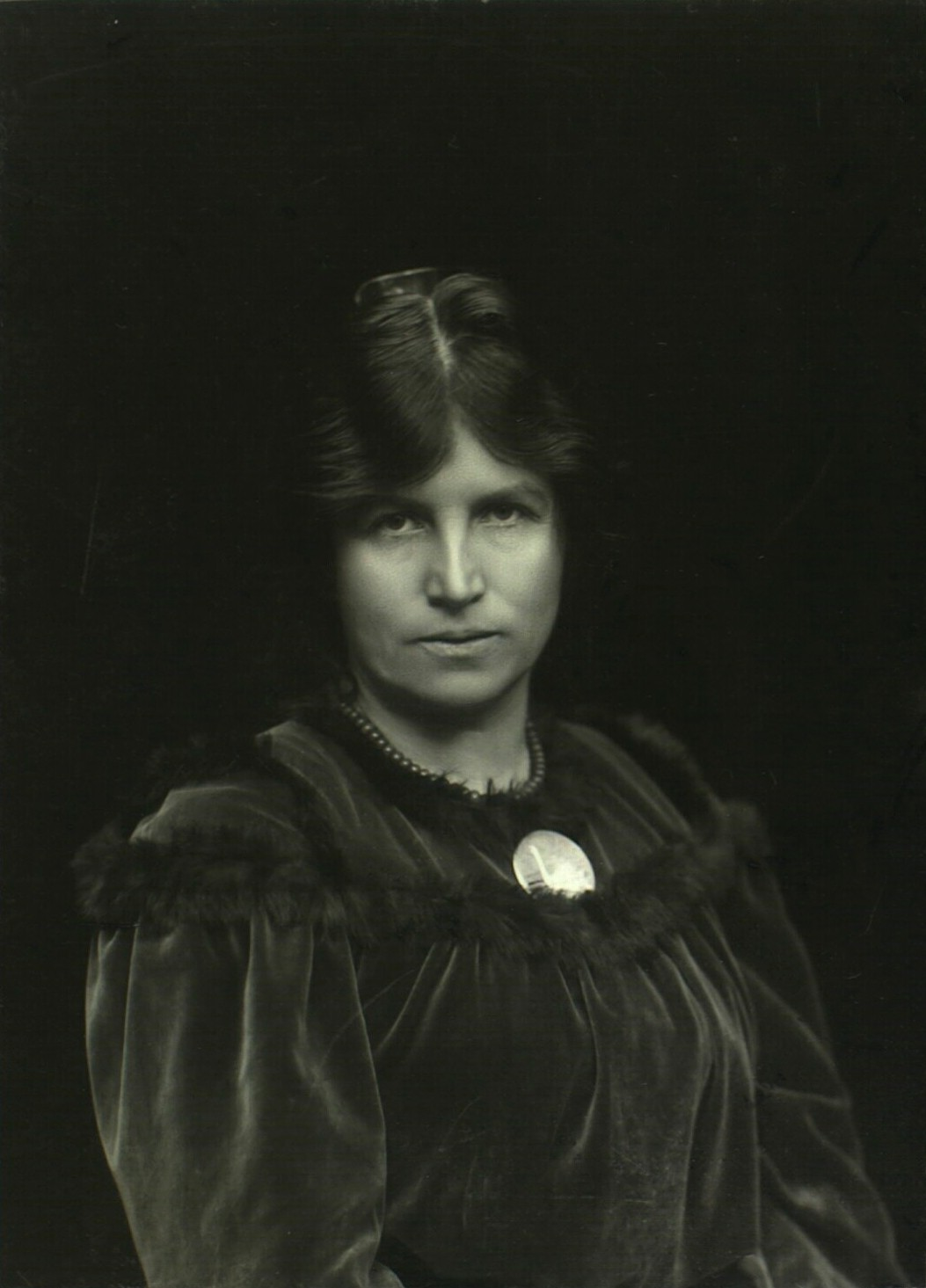
Agnes Slott-Møller

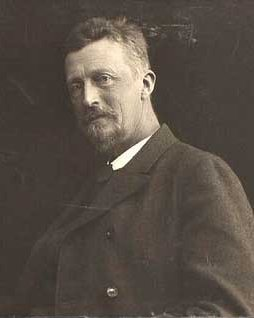
August Jerndorff

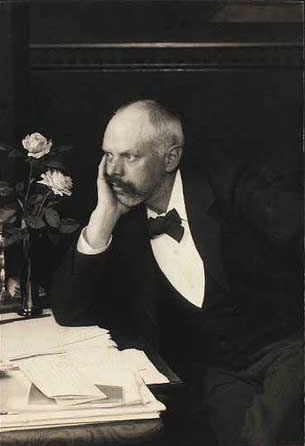
Carl Ewald

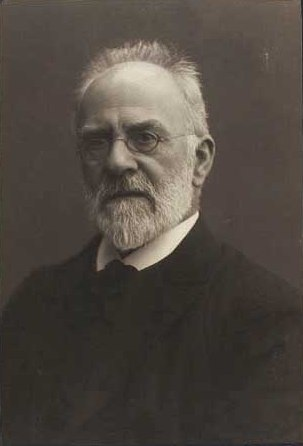
Emil Christian Hansen

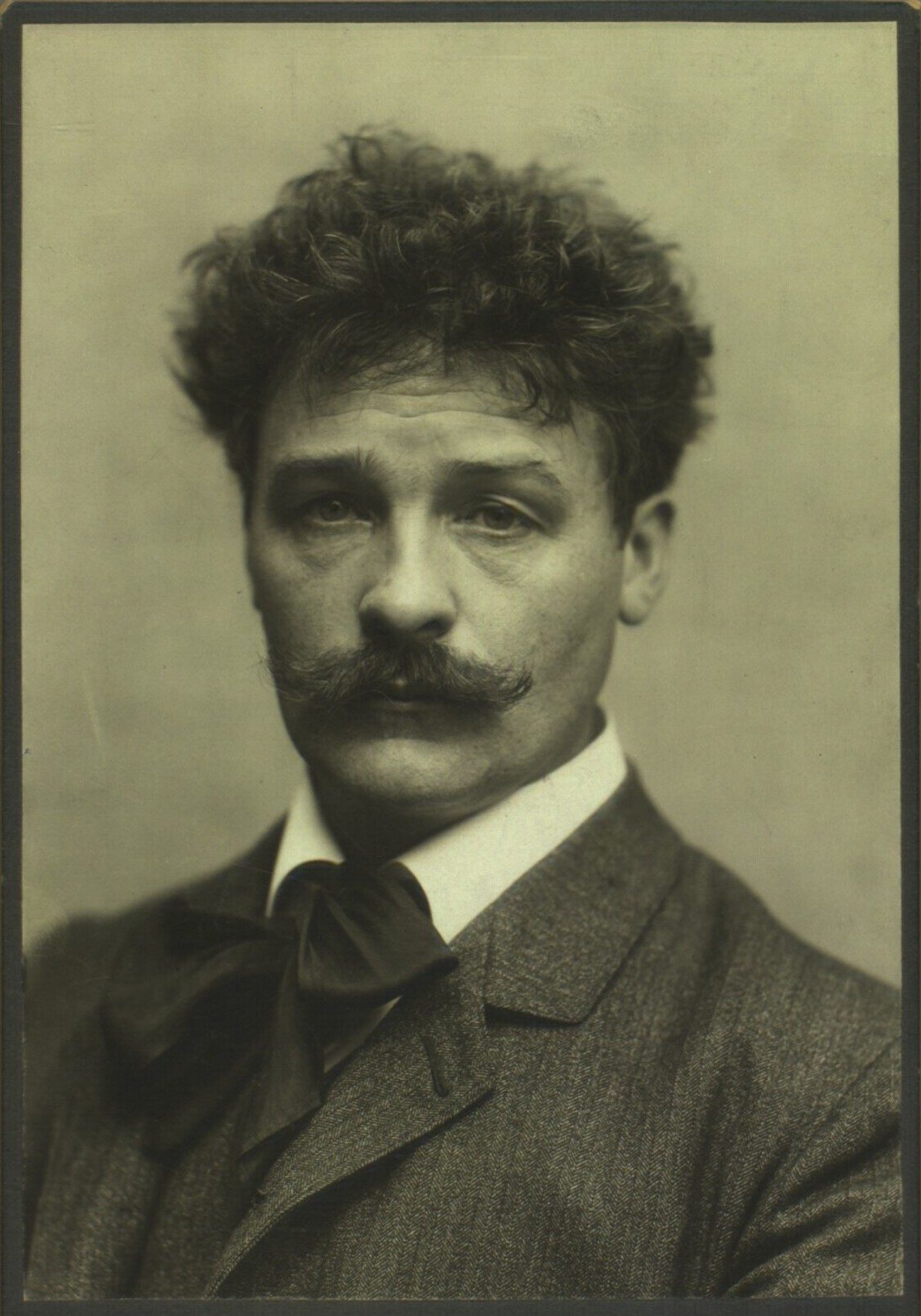
Georg Jensen

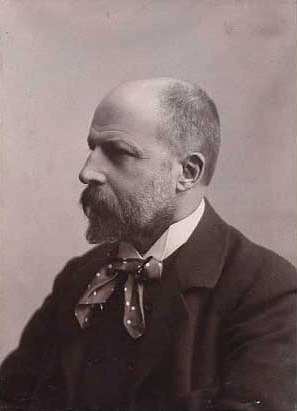
Pietro Krohn

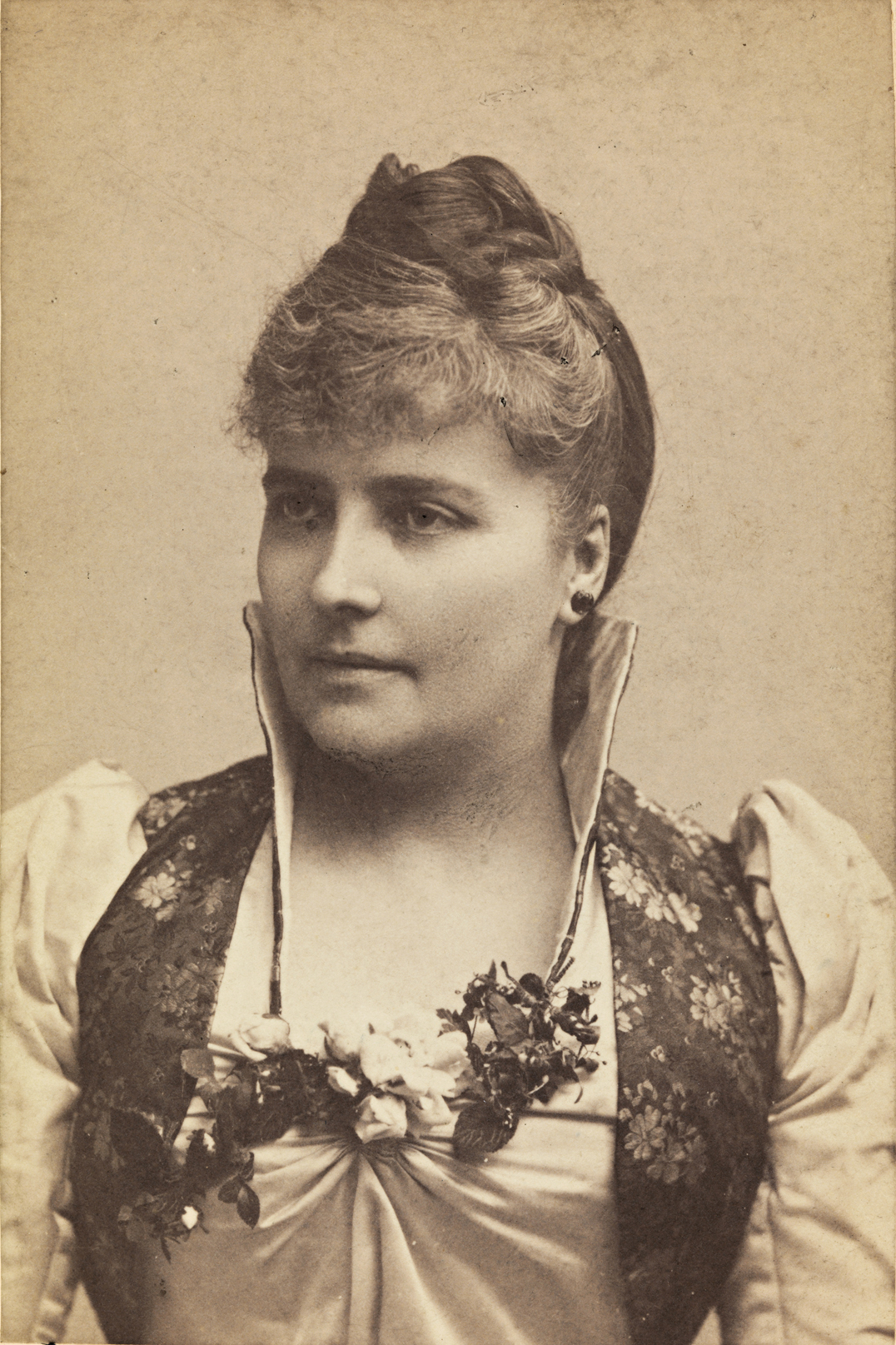
Amalie Skram

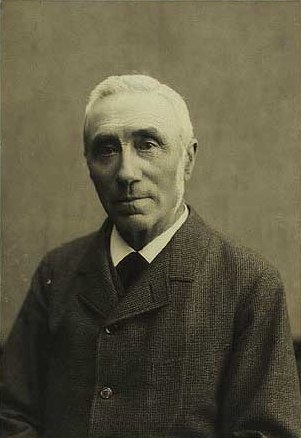
Heinrich Nicolai Valentiner

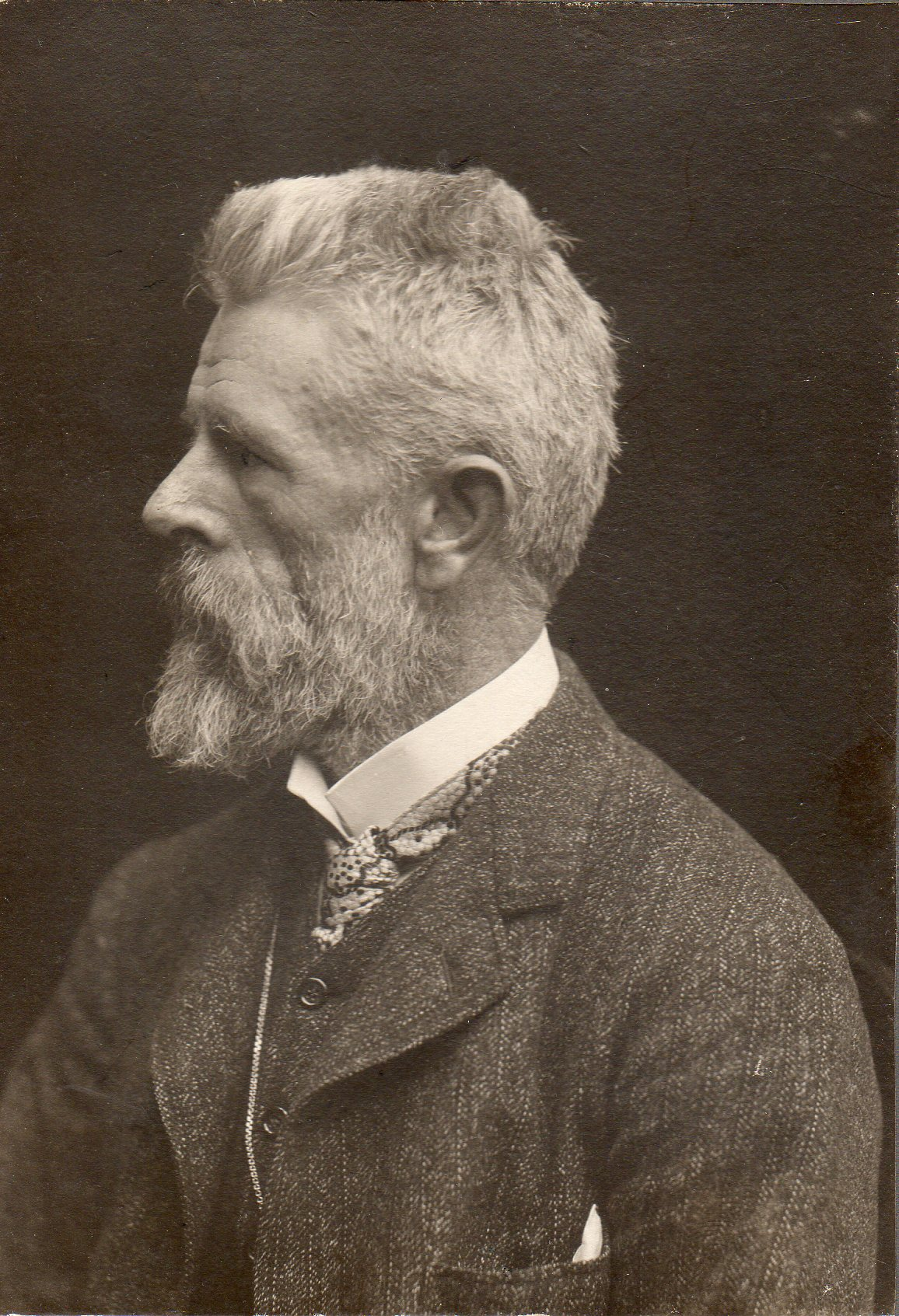
Laurits Tuxen

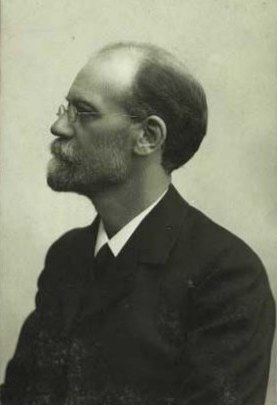
Johan Erik Vesti Boas
