= Løveapoteket =

Coordinates: 55.6786°N 12.5761°E

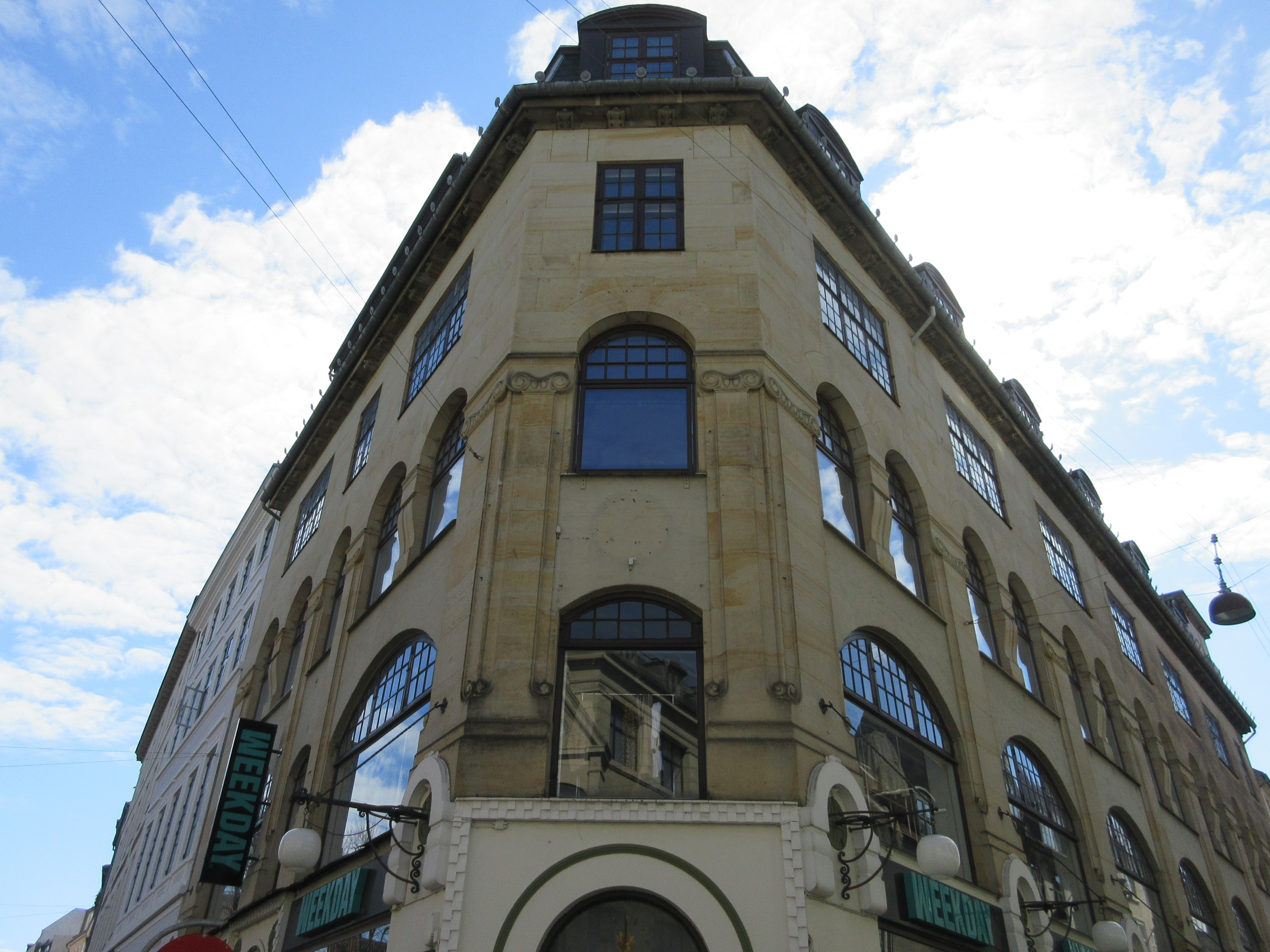
Løveapoteket's building at Amagertorv 33 in 2020

Løveapoteket (lit. 'The Lion Pharmacy') was the first pharmacy in Copenhagen, Denmark. It opened in 1620 and operated until its closing in 1971, for a total of approximately 350 years. Throughout its entire existence, it was located at the corner of Amagertorv (No. 33) and Hyskenstræde (No. 1). The most recent building that it occupied was built for the pharmacy in 1908.

== History ==
=== 17th century ===
Løveapoteket was established by Esaias Fleischer on 12 September 1620 and served as a pharmacy for the Danish Royal Court from 1633 to 1715. Esaias Fleischer was married twice, last to Maren Hansdatter, a sister of Hans Nansen's wife. He died in January 1663. In 1650 his pharmacy privilege was made heritable, and his son Gregorius Fleischer inherited the pharmacy. He ran it for fifty years, from 1665 to 1715.

=== 18th century ===
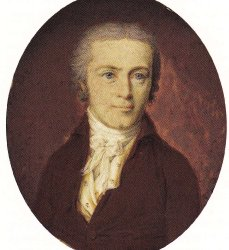
Ludvig Manthey

The pharmacy was from 1716 to 1742 owned by Andreas Winter. The pharmacy was then acquired by August Günter. His son ran it until 1790. It was then endowed to his son-in-law, Ludvig Manthey, who had just passed his pharmaceutical exam.

The pharmacy was destroyed in the Copenhagen Fire of 1795. Manthey commissioned Caspar Frederik Harsdorff to design a new building for the pharmacy, and it was completed the following year.

In 1796, he was also appointed as director of the Royal Porcelain Manufactory. In 1800, he was sent abroad by the king to study porcelain manufacturing. Hans Christian Ørsted, his protégé, managed his pharmacy while he was away.

=== 19th century ===
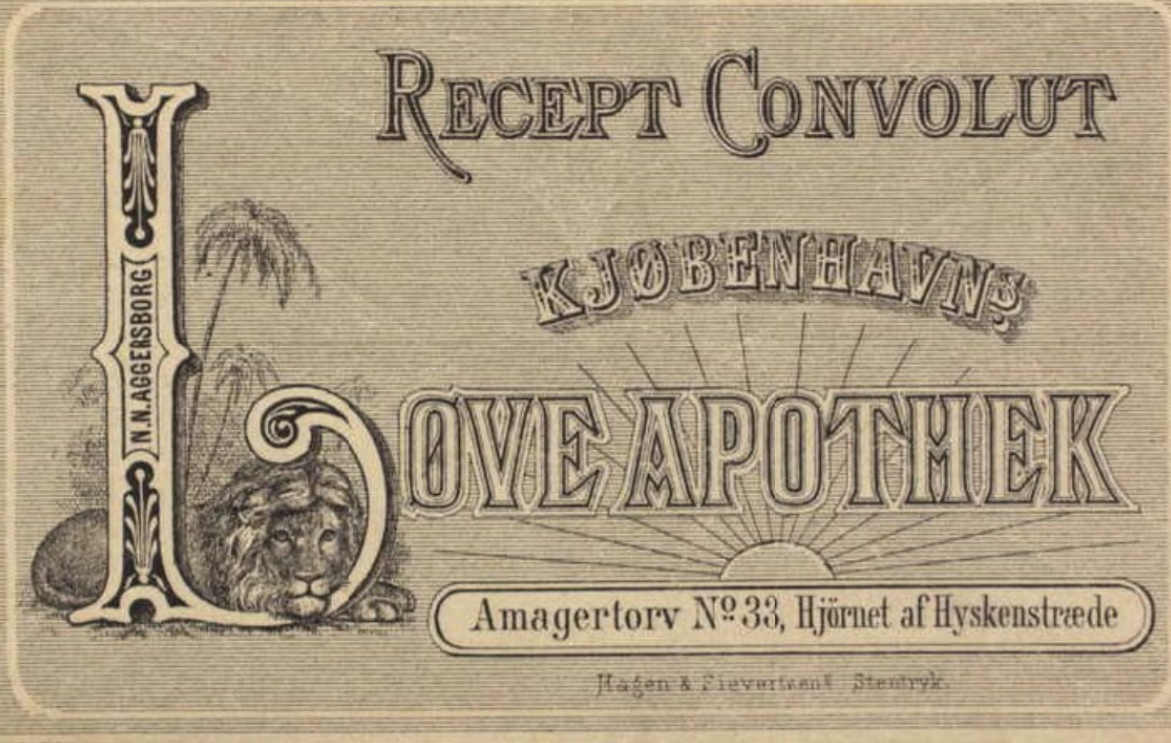
Late 19th-century advertisement

In 1805, Manthey took over the management of Ørholm and Brede Works. He therefore sold the pharmacy on Amagertorv to Max Boye, who kept it until 1835. His successor, Jørgen Albert Bech, who owned the pharmacy from 1835 to 1859, was later able to purchase the estates Tårnborg and Kruusesminde at Korsør. The next owner, Harald August Faber, operated the pharmacy until his death in 1873. Niels Nørgaard Aggersborg was the owner from 1877 to 1889. He was succeeded by Paolo Victor Madvig, who owned it until 1904.

=== 20th century ===
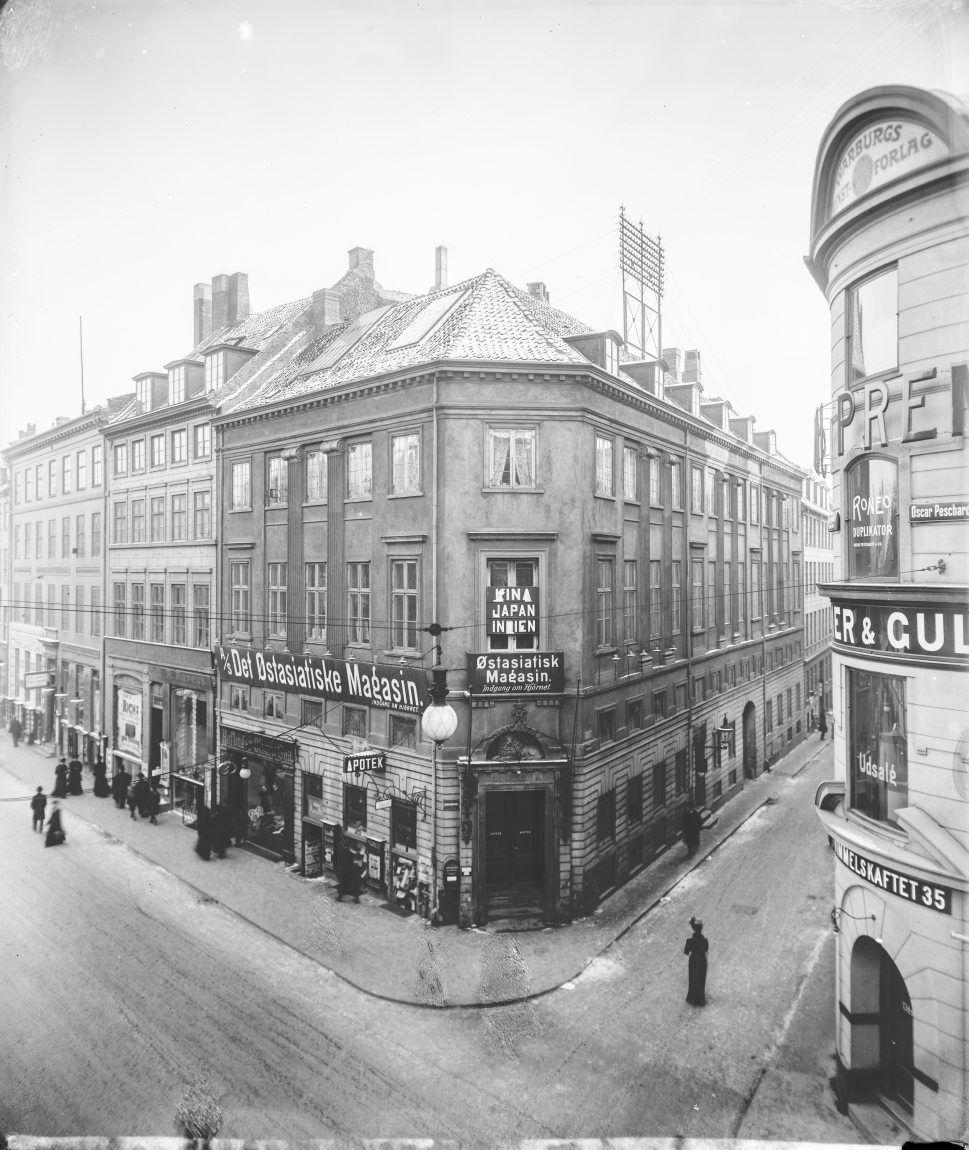
Løveapoteket's old building

August Kongsted and Anton Antons, who acquired the pharmacy in 1908, founded Løvens Kemiske Fabrik (now Leo Pharma) the same year. The company acquired a lot in Hyskenstræde and constructed a production facility.

Managing director Aage Frederiksen was among the residents in 1919.

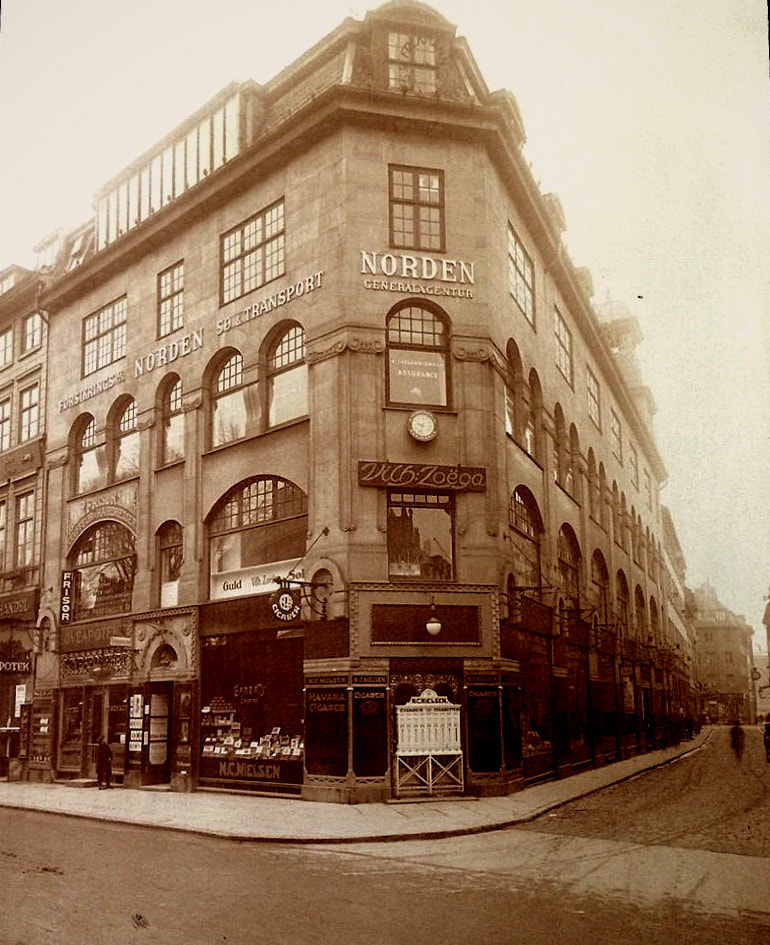
The new building

The photographer Frederik Riise operated a photographic studio on the top floor of the building between 1909 and 1913. The photographic studio was from 1914 to 1928 continued by Julius Folkmann.

August Kongsted's son August Julius Helmuth Kongsted took over the pharmacy in 1920. Its production facilities relocated to Brønshøj in 1926 and Ballerup in 1958.

August Julius Helmuth Kongsted died in 1939. The pharmacy was then passed on to his son-in-law, Ludvig Holtmann, who ran it until it closed in 1971.

== Building ==
The current building on the site was built in 1907–1908. It was designed by Victor Nyebølle og Christian Brandstrup. A lion relief from Harsdorff's building has been installed above the gate.

== Pharmacists ==
- 12 September 1620 – 13 January 1663 Esais Fleischer
- 16 June 1665 – April 1715 Gregorius Fleischer
- 23 March 1716–1742 Andreas Winther
- 21 April 1742–1758 August Günther
- 13 October 1758 – 13 February 1790 Christopher Günther
- 5 August 1791 – 30 June 1805 Johan Georg Ludvig Manthey
- 17 July 1805–1835 Marx Boye
- 31 July 1835 – 30 April 1859 Jørgen Albert Bech
- 31 May 1859 – December 1873 Harald August Faber
- 22 April 1874 – 31 October 1876 the estate after Faber
- 12 January 1877 – 31 October 1889 Niels Nørgaard Aggersborg
- 1 September 1889 – 31 December 1904 Paolo Victor Madvig
- 1 December 1904 – 1 February 1907 Gustav Rink with
- 1 December 1904–1908 Claus Albert Clausen
- 30 May 1908 – 18 December 1917 August Julius Helmuth Kongsted with
- 30 May 1908 – 11 April 1920 Anton Marius Mathias Christian
- 21 October 1920 – 24 April 1939 August Julius Helmuth Kongsted
- 6 November 1939 – 30 April 1971 Carl Ludvig Holtmann
