= Ludvig Manthey =

Danish civil servant

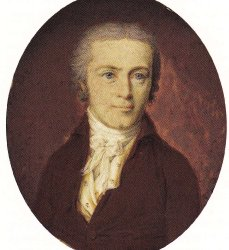
- Born: 3 June 1769; Glückstadt, Duchy of Holstein
- Died: 18 January 1842 (aged 72); Copenhagen, Denmark
- Occupations: Pharmacist, industrialist and landowner

Johan Georg Ludvig Manthey (3 June 1769 – 18 January 1842) was a Danish pharmacist. He owned The Lion Pharmacy in Copenhagen from 1791 to 1805, managed Ørholm and Brede Works from 1805 to 1811 and served as director of the Royal Copenhagen Porcelain Manufactory from 1796 to 1812. He lived on the Falkensteen estate at Slagelse from 1812.

== Early life and education ==
Manthey was born in Glückstadt, the son of garrison priest Johan Gustav Ludvig Manthey (1735–1813) and Sophia Dorothea Hermes (1745–1826). His father later served as parish priest at the German St. Peter's Church in Copenhagen. His younger brother was Johan Daniel Timotheus Manthey.

Ludvig Manthey studied medicine at the University of Copenhagen and was in 1788 appointed as chief surgeon on a naval ship and later that same year as a lecturer in Copenhagen. He was also employed as a teacher at the pharmacy of Frederiks Hospital in spite of the fact that he had not apprenticed as a pharmacist. In 1789, he also obtained a degree in pharmacy from the university. He was awarded Cappel's Travel Grant and continued his studies abroad.

== Career ==
In 1791, Manthey succeeded Christopher Günther, his father-in-law, as pharmacist and owner of The Lion Pharmacy on Amagertorv in Copenhagen. This resulted in protests from the Medical Board (Det medicinske Kollegium) due to his lack of formal training as a pharmacist.

In 1795, he was employed as a lecturer in chemistry at the university, and later that same year as an extraordinary professor. In 1796, he assumed a position as director of the Royal Porcelain Manufactory. In 1800, he was sent abroad to study porcelain manufacturing. Hans Christian Ørsted, his protégé, managed his pharmacy while he was away.

He sold the pharmacy in 1805 and then managed the Ørholm and Brede Works until 1811.

He was a member of the Royal Danish Academy of Sciences from 1804 and served as assessor in the Sundhedskollegietin1803-05. He wrote a substantial number of scientific articles and contributed to Pharmacopoea Danica (1805).

== Personal life ==
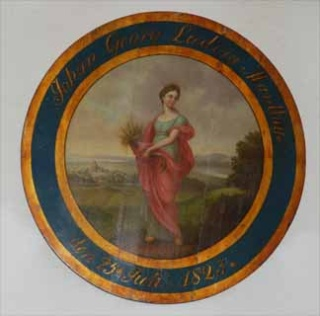
Prize won by Mantey in the annual Bird King shooting competition 1929.

Manthey married twice. His first wife was Augusta Günther (1768–1806), a daughter of pharmacist Christopher Günther (1730–90) and Sophie Charlotte Hauber (1733–87). They were married on 19 August 1791 in St. Peter's Church in Copenhagen. His second wife was Annette (Ane) Pauline Holten (1785–1855), a daughter of pharmacist and later customs officer Johannes (Hans) Holten (1741–1816) and Ane Margrethe Abildgaard (1747–1826). She was a sister of banker Nicolai Abraham Holten and a granddaughter of the artist Nicolai Abraham Abildgaard. They were married on 24 January 1808.

Manthey acquired Søllerødgård in 1811. In 1812, he exchanged it for Falkensteen at Slagelse. He died on 18 January 1842 in Copenhagen and is buried in Gerlev at Slagelse.
