= Sankt Hans Hospital =

Psychiatric hospital in Roskilde, Denmark

Coordinates: 55°39′02″N 12°04′07″E

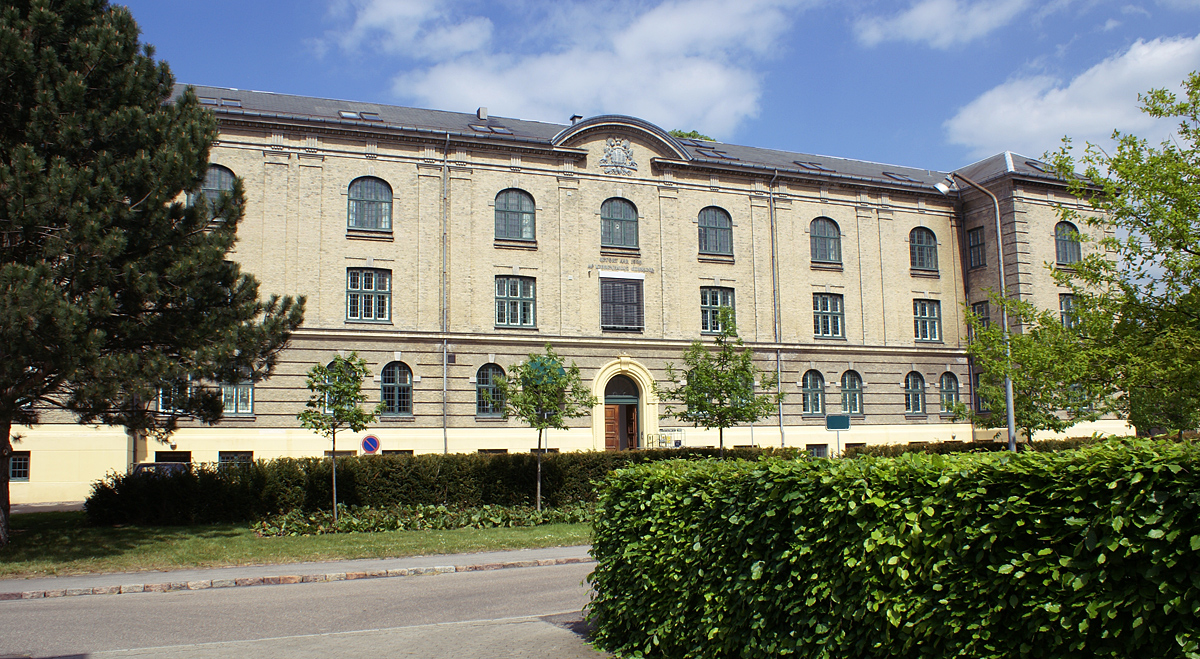
Fjordhus Department, Sankt Hans Hospital

Sankt Hans Hospital is a psychiatric hospital in Roskilde on the Danish island of Zealand, 30 km from Copenhagen. Although situated in the Zealand Region, it is owned by the Capital Region and serves patients from that region. The land was bought by the forerunner of Copenhagen Municipality at the beginning of the 1800s so it could relocate the municipality's psychiatric hospital to a more rural location. With a history beginning in 1620, the hospital now has 180 beds and offers specialized treatment in the areas of forensic psychiatry and dual diagnosis.

== History ==
The institution was first known as Københavns Pesthus which accommodated mentally ill patients from c. 1620 to 1651 when it moved to Copenhagen Castle's Ladegård in 1651. In 1808, the Copenhagen authorities bought Bistrup Manor in Roskilde for the care of the mentally ill, invalids and the poor. By the 1850s, the number of psychiatric patients had substantially increased, necessitating the establishment of a new treatment centre designed by Gottlieb Bindesbøll which was completed in 1859. The hospital was later expanded in order to function as Copenhagen's psychiatric hospital with some 2,000 beds. In 1987, Roskilde County acquired part of the facilities which it called Roskilde Amtssygehus Fjorden. As of 2014, the Psykiatrisk Center Sct. Hans, specializing in forensic psychiatry and dual diagnosis is under the authority of the psychiatric department of the Capital Region of Denmark.

== Today's hospital ==
With a staff of some 600, the hospital has 180 beds in 13 open and closed units for forensic patients and psychotic patients with substance abuse. There is also an outpatient clinic in Copenhagen.
