= The Kellerian Establishments =

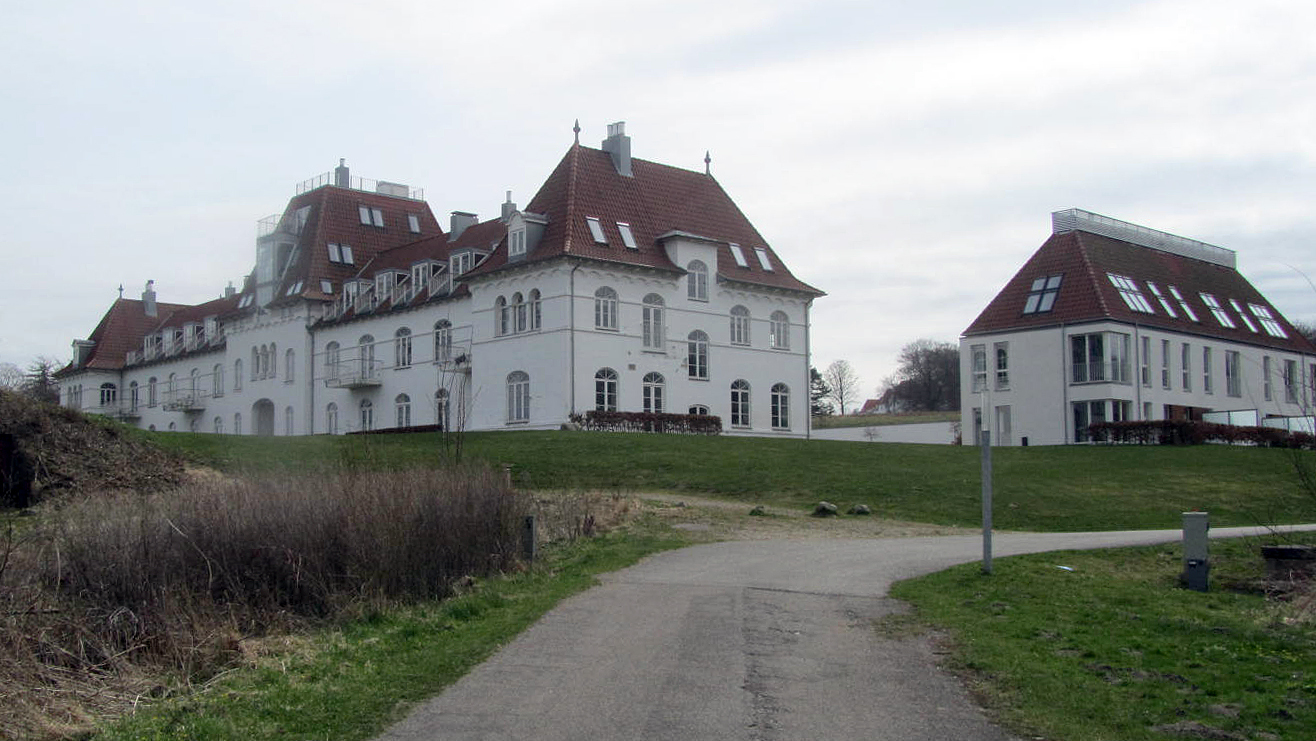
The main building in Brejning, today owner-occupied flats

The Kellerian Establishments or the Keller Institutions (DKI) was Denmark's and Northern Europe's largest collection of institutions for the mentally disabled. The headquarters were located in Brejning by Vejle Fjord and existed until 1990.

== History ==
The Keller Institute was founded in 1867 after the deaf pedagogue, cand.theol. Johan Keller had expanded his private school for the deaf and dumb in Copenhagen to include the intellectually disabled in 1865. He was succeeded as director by his son Christian Keller.

In later years they have been subject to controversy.

== See also ==
- Karens Minde
