= Elizabeth Charlotte, Madame Palatine =

Duchess of Orléans (1652–1722)

Princess Elizabeth Charlotte of the Palatinate
- Duchess of Orléans
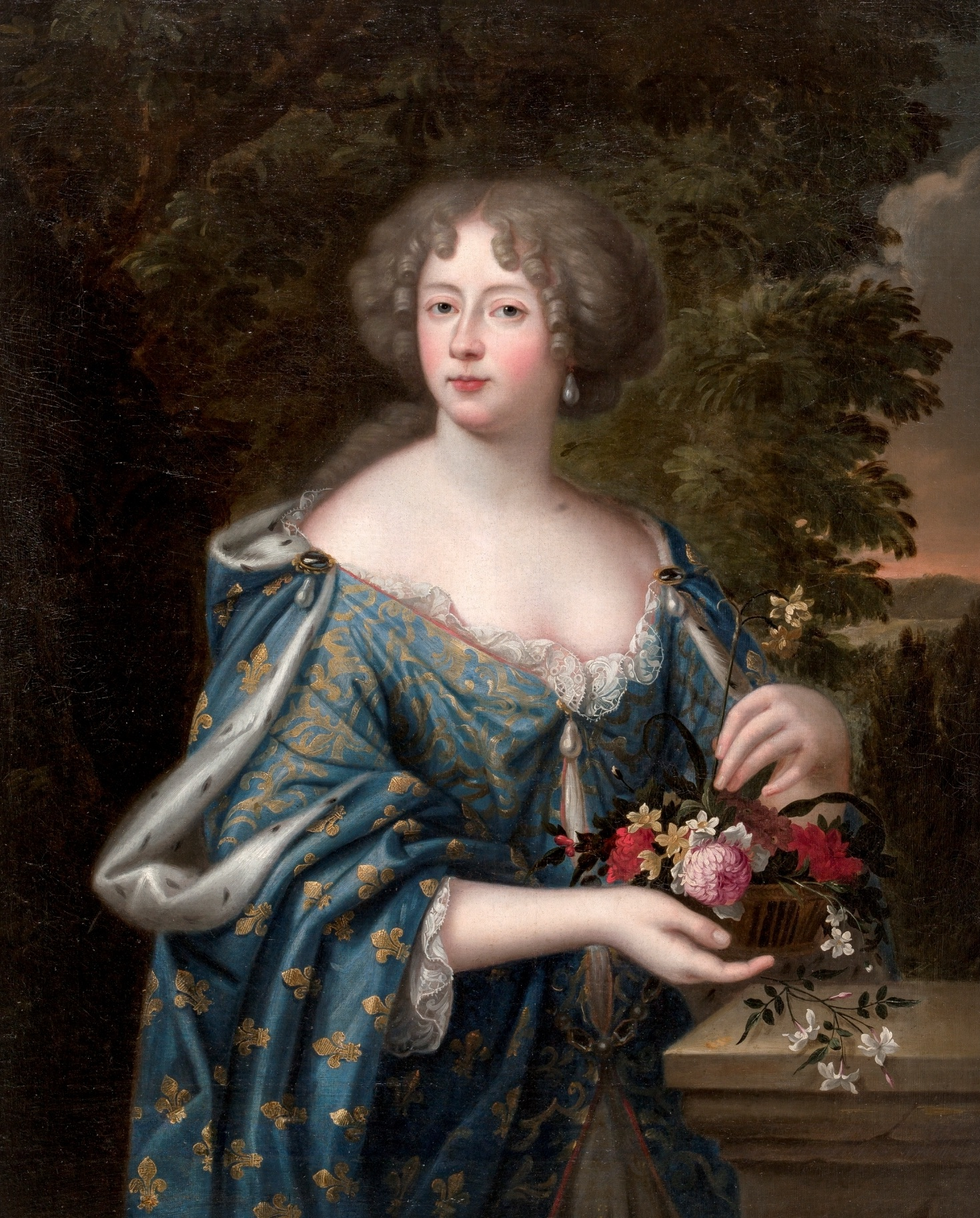
- Portrait by Pierre Mignard, 1675
- Born: 27 May 1652; Heidelberg Castle, Heidelberg, Electoral Palatinate, Holy Roman Empire
- Died: 8 December 1722 (aged 70); Château de Saint-Cloud, Île-de-France, France
- Burial: Basilica of Saint Denis, France
- Spouse: Philippe I, Duke of Orléans (m. 1671; died 1701)
- Issue Detail: Philippe II, Duke of Orléans; Élisabeth Charlotte, Duchess of Lorraine
- House: Palatinate-Simmern (by birth); Bourbon (by marriage)
- Father: Charles I Louis, Elector Palatine
- Mother: Landgravine Charlotte of Hesse-Kassel
- Religion: Roman Catholicism; prev. Calvinism

Madame Elizabeth Charlotte, Duchess of Orléans (born Princess Elizabeth Charlotte of the Palatinate, German: Elisabeth Charlotte; 27 May 1652 – 8 December 1722), also known as Liselotte von der Pfalz, was a German member of the House of Wittelsbach who married into the French royal family. She was the second wife of Monsieur Philippe I, Duke of Orléans (younger brother of Louis XIV). By Philippe, Liselotte was the mother of Philippe II, Duke of Orléans, and Élisabeth Charlotte, Duchess of Lorraine. Philippe II was France's ruler during the Regency. Liselotte gained literary and historical importance primarily through preservation of her correspondence, which is of great cultural and historical value due to her sometimes very blunt descriptions of French court life and is today one of the best-known German-language texts of the Baroque period.

Liselotte not only became the ancestress of the House of Orléans, which came to the French throne with Louis Philippe I, the so-called "Citizen King" from 1830 to 1848, but also became the ancestress of numerous European royal families, so she was also called the "Grandmother of Europe". Through her daughter she was the grandmother of Francis I, Holy Roman Emperor, the husband of Maria Theresa, and great-grandmother of Joseph II and Leopold II (both Holy Roman Emperors) and Marie Antoinette, the last Queen of France before the French Revolution.

== Life ==
=== Early years ===
Elizabeth Charlotte was born on 27 May 1652 in the castle of Heidelberg as the second child and only daughter of Charles I Louis, Elector Palatine, and his wife Charlotte of Hesse-Kassel. Named after her paternal grandmother Elizabeth Stuart and her own mother, from a young age she was nicknamed Liselotte, a portmanteau of both her names. An emergency baptism was performed shortly after her birth due to her being very weak and thin. She was raised in the Reformed Protestant faith, the most widespread denomination in the Electoral Palatinate at that time.

Liselotte was a lively child who liked to run around and climb trees to nibble on cherries. She sometimes claimed that she would have preferred to be a boy, and referred to herself in her letters as a "wild child" (rauschenplattenknechtgen).

The marriage of Liselotte's parents soon turned into a disaster, and Liselotte was frequently witness to acts of domestic violence. In 1657, Elector Charles I Louis separated from his wife Charlotte in order to marry morganatically Marie Luise von Degenfeld, who thus became Liselotte's stepmother. Liselotte likely perceived her as an intruder, but had good relationships with many of her 13 half-siblings, the Raugrafen. With two of her half-sisters, Louise (1661–1733) and Amalie Elisabeth, called Amelise (1663–1709), she kept a lifelong correspondence. Her half-brother Charles Louis (1658–1688), called Karllutz, was a particular favorite of hers; she also called him "Black Head" (Schwarzkopfel) because of his hair color and was ecstatic when he later visited her (1673) in Paris. His early death in battle deeply saddened her.

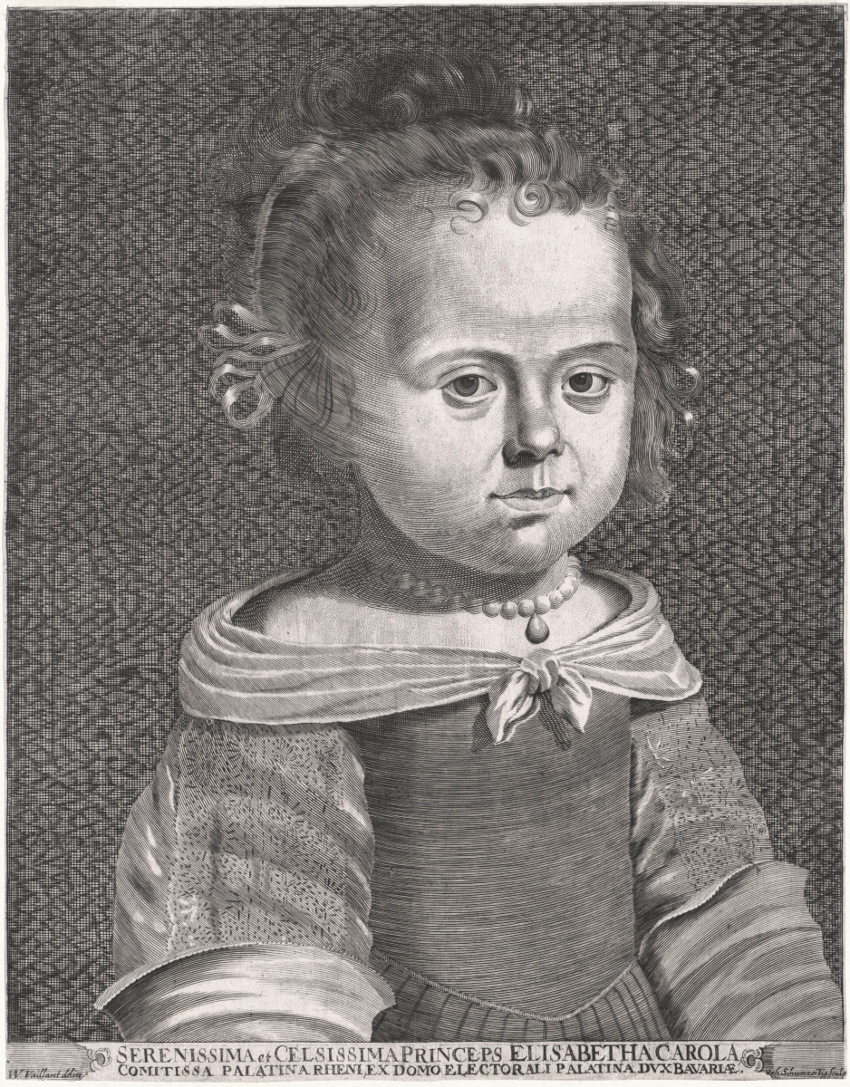
Liselotte as a child of about 4 or 5 years, copper engraving by Johann Schweizer after Wallerant Vaillant. Austrian National Library, Vienna

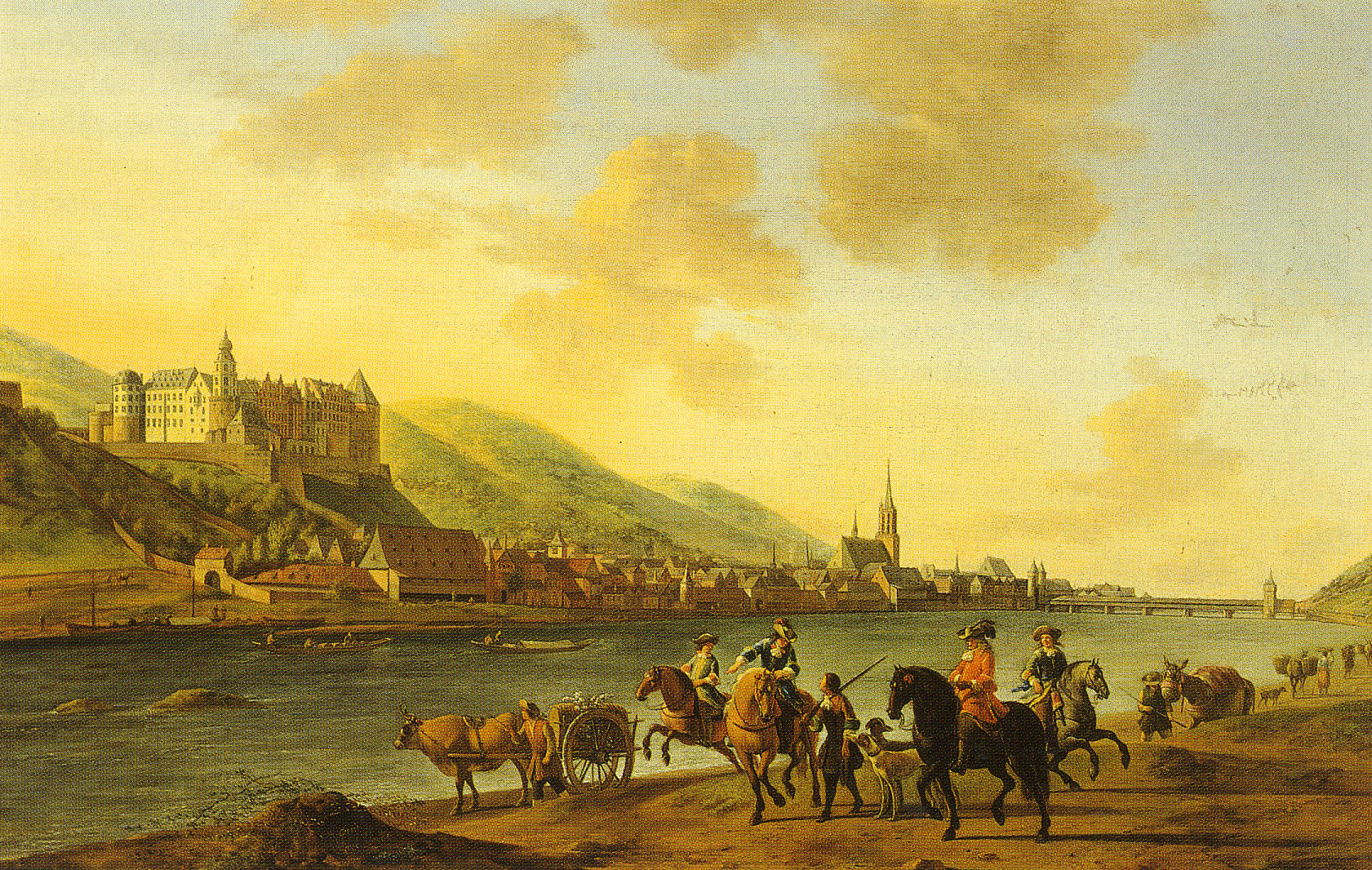
Heidelberg Castle by Gerrit Berckheyde, 1670

The most important caregiver in Liselotte's life was her aunt Sophia of the Palatinate, her father's youngest sister, who also lived in Heidelberg Castle with Charles I Louis until her marriage in 1658 with Ernest Augustus, Duke of Brunswick-Lüneburg. In 1659, Liselotte's father sent her to her aunt's court in Hanover in an attempt to separate her from his estranged wife Charlotte. Liselotte later remembered this time as the happiest of her life. Sophia became an important motherly figure for her niece, and remained her most important confidante and correspondent throughout her life. During this time she also underwent a total of three trips to The Hague, where Liselotte met her paternal grandmother Elizabeth Stuart, the "Winter Queen" of Bohemia, who was still living in exile. Elizabeth wasn't particularly fond of children, but she became very fond of her granddaughter, whom she found similar to her own family, the Stuarts: "She is not like the House of Hesse...she is like ours". Her relatives in The Hague also included the slightly older William of Orange-Nassau, who was her playmate and was later to become King of England. She later also remembered the birth of Sophia's son George Louis, who also became King of Great Britain. Liselotte was fluent in French as early as 1661, when a French woman named Madame Trelon, who did not understand German, was appointed as her governess. When Duke Ernest Augustus of Brunswick took office as Prince-Bishop of Osnabrück in September 1662, Liselotte moved with Sophia to Iburg Castle.

In 1663 Elector Charles I Louis granted Liselotte's mother Charlotte monetary compensation in exchange for her vacating the Heidelberg residence. Immediately afterwards the Elector brought his daughter back to the court in Heidelberg. Liselotte now received a courtly education customary for princely houses at the time, consisting of lessons in French, dancing, playing the spinet, singing, handicrafts and history. In addition, she was regularly read to from the Bible "in two languages, German and French". Her new governess, Maria Ursula Kolb von Wartenberg, called "the Kolbin", instructed her against "any hatred or prejudice against someone because they belong to a different religion". This religious tolerance was quite unusual in its time and stemmed from the relatively relaxed attitude of her father Charles I Louis, who was a Calvinist himself, but had a built in Mannheim a Concordia church (Konkordienkirche), where the followers of the Calvinist (or Reformed), Lutheran and Catholic denominations could celebrate their rituals. Liselotte benefited from this relatively open religious attitude throughout her life; she had learned about the Lutheran denomination at court in Hanover and, decades later, she still knew how to sing Lutheran chorals by heart. Before her marriage, she was required to convert to the Catholic faith for dynastic reasons, though she remained skeptical of dogmatism throughout her life, and was often critical of "the priests", even while attending mass on a daily basis. She remained convinced of the Calvinist doctrine of predestination and was critical of the Catholic veneration of the saints.

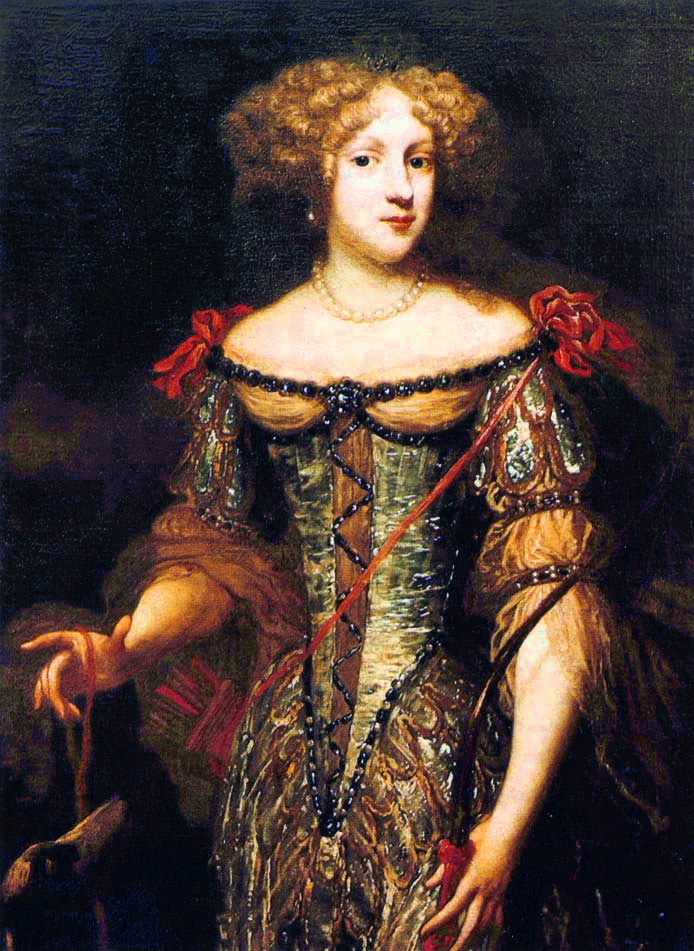
Anonymous, circa 1670

Etienne Polier, her first stable master and steward, became a lifelong confidante, whom she took with her to France after her marriage and who remained in her service for life.

=== Marriage ===
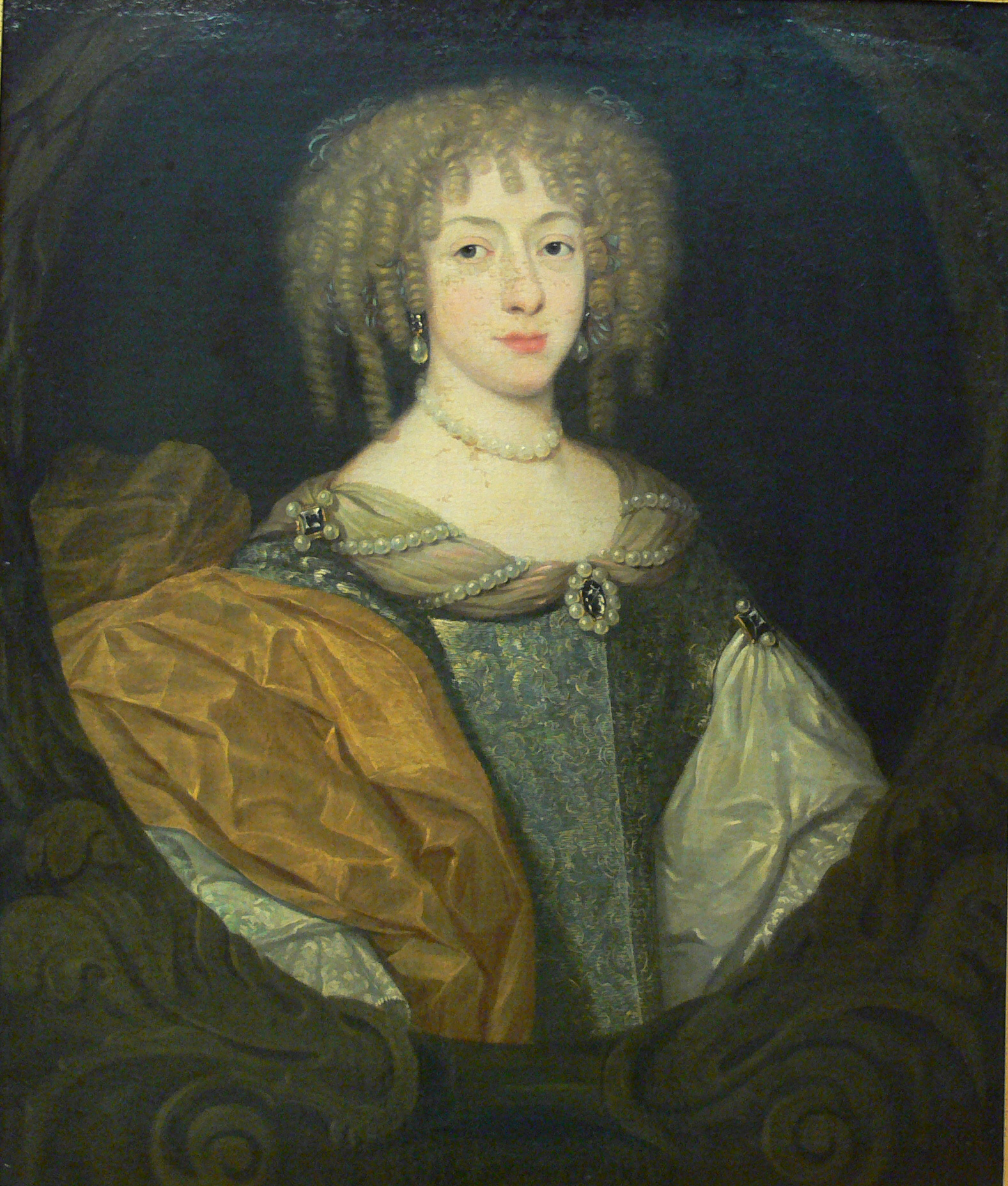
Elizabeth Charlotte, Princess Palatine, ca. 1670–71. Currently at Reiss Engelhorn Museum, Mannheim.

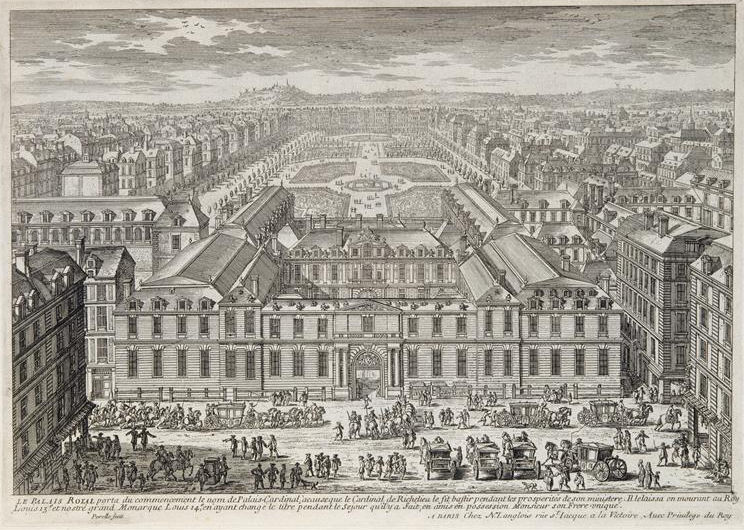
View of the Palais Royal, 1680.

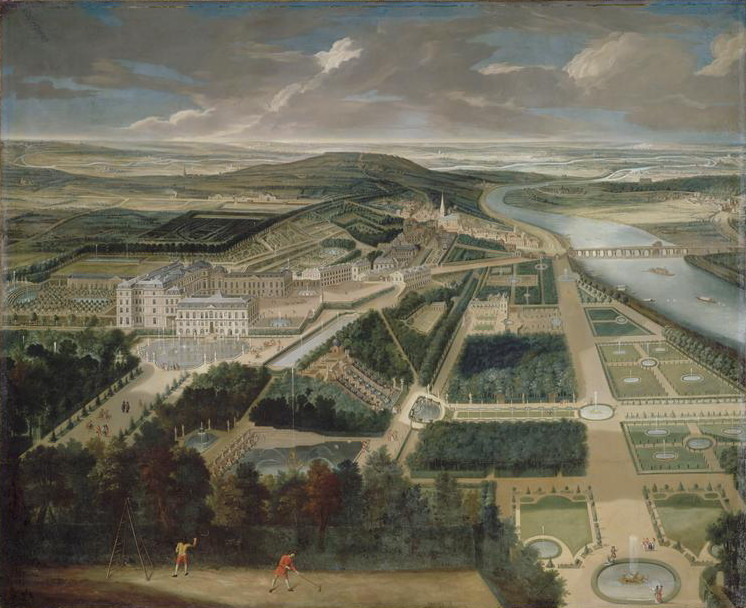
View of the Château de Saint-Cloud, ca. 1675.

Liselotte was married in 1671 to the brother of King Louis XIV of France, Philippe I, Duke of Orléans, known as "Monsieur", the title given to the eldest brother of the King under the Ancien Régime. As wife of the Duke of Orléans, Liselotte assumed the style of Madame. This political union was conceived by Anna Gonzaga, Liselotte's aunt (as widow of Edward, Count Palatine of Simmern, Charles I Louis' younger brother) and an old friend of the Duke of Orléans; she negotiated the marriage contract, including the terms surrounding Liselotte's required conversion to Catholicism. Anna escorted Liselotte from Heidelberg to Paris. The wedding per procurationem took place on 16 November 1671 at the Cathedral of Saint Stephen in Metz by Bishop Georges d'Aubusson de La Feuillade; in representation of the groom was the Duke of Plessis-Praslin. The day before, she solemnly renounced her old Reformed faith and converted to the Catholic faith. She met her husband, who was 12 years her senior, for the first time on 20 November 1671 in Châlons.

Monsieur didn't look ignoble, but he was very short, had pitch black hair, eyebrows and eyelids, big brown eyes, a long and rather narrow face, a big nose, a mouth that was too small and ugly teeth, more feminine than masculine manners, loved neither horses nor hunting, nothing but games, holding cercle, eating well, dancing and being dressed, in a word, everything that ladies love. ... The King loved gallantry with ladies, I do not believe that my husband has been in love in his life.

— Liselotte von der Pfalz: Letter to Caroline, Princess of Wales from 9 January 1716 about her husband Philippe, called Monsieur.

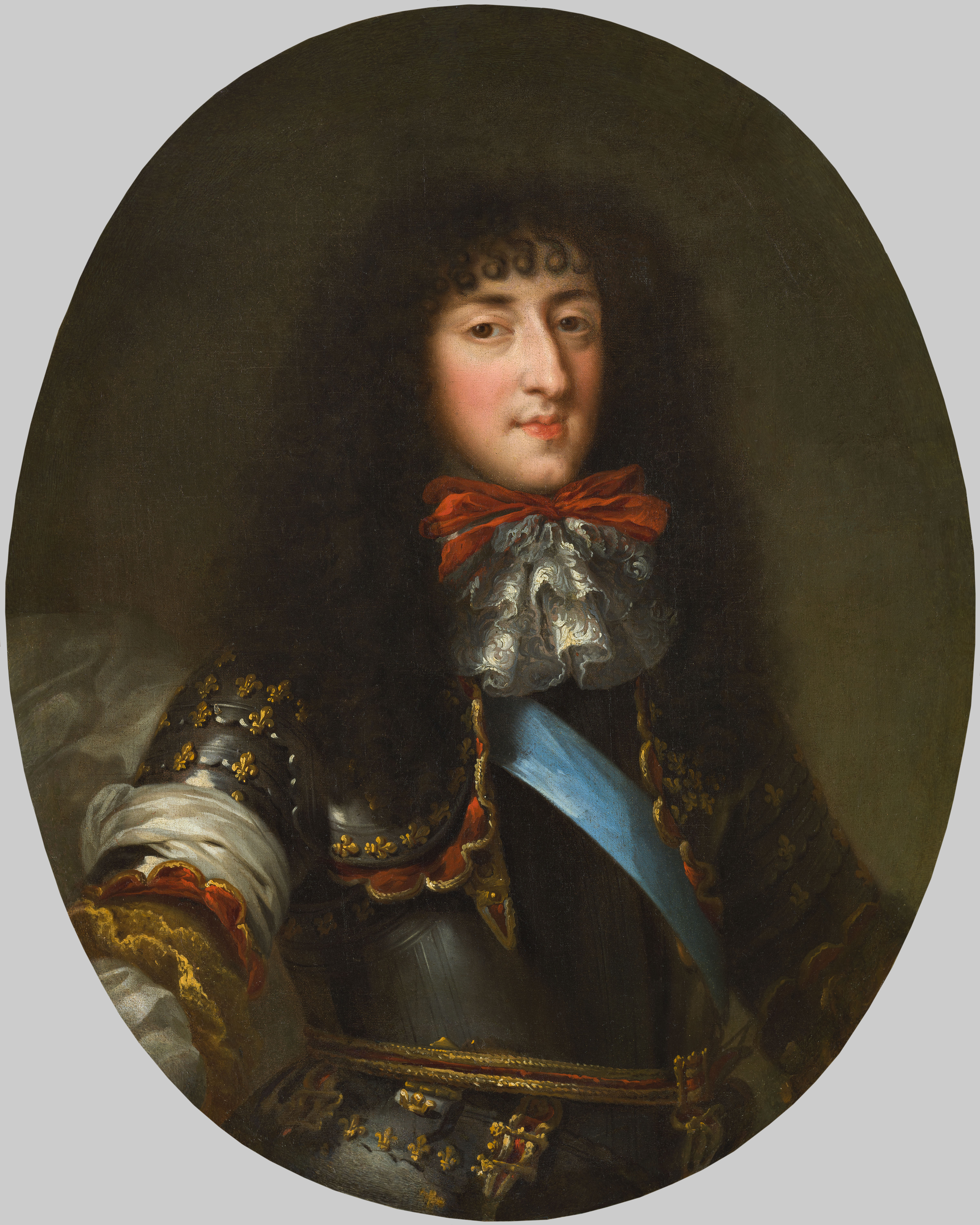
Philippe I, Duke of Orleans

Until her husband's death in 1701, she resided in her own apartments in her husband's residences, the Palais Royal in Paris, and the Château de Saint-Cloud. The couple lived mostly at the royal court, where they had to be present for about three-quarters of the year, first in the Château de Saint-Germain-en-Laye and, after its completion in 1682, in the Palace of Versailles, where they had two adjacent apartments in the main wing. They also had apartments in the Palace of Fontainebleau, where the court went in autumn for the hunting season. Liselotte (unlike her husband) took part in this tradition with enthusiasm. She often rode with the King through the woods and fields all day long, from morning to night, without being deterred by occasional falls or sunburn. From Fontainebleau, the couple made regular visits to Montargis Castle, which belonged to Monsieur and which, according to their marriage contract, would later fall to Madame as a widow's seat. Liselotte maintained her own court of 250 people, which cost 250,000 livres annually, while her husband maintained an even larger one.

This was the Duke of Orléans' second marriage, his first wife and cousin Henrietta of England having died suddenly and under mysterious circumstances in 1670. He brought two daughters into his new marriage, 9-year-old Marie-Louise (with whom Liselotte was able to build a warm, sisterly relationship) and 2-year-old Anne Marie (who had no memory of her birth mother and whom Liselotte treated as her own child).

Liselotte and Philippe's marriage was difficult, as he was bisexual and lived quite openly as such. He led a largely independent life, together with and influenced by his long-time lover, the Chevalier de Lorraine. He had many other favorites and numerous affairs with younger men, including Antoine Morel de Volonne (whom Monsieur made Liselotte's Hofmarschall during 1673–1683). Morel had a very poor reputation even by the standards of the time: "He stole, he lied, he swore, was atheist and sodomite and sold boys like horses."

Liselotte had no choice but to come to terms with these conditions, and she ultimately became an unusually enlightened woman for her time, albeit in a somewhat resigned way:

Where have you and Louisse got stuck that you know so little about the world? (...) those who want to hate everyone who loves young guys wouldn't be able to love 6 people here [...] there are all kinds of genres; [...] (This is followed by a list of various types of homo and bisexuality, as well as pederasty and sodomy, editor's note) [...] You tell, dear Amelisse, that the world is even worse than you never thought.

— Liselotte von der Pfalz: Letter to her half-sister Raugräfin Amelise from 3 December 1705.

Her most important biographer, the historian and Antwerp professor of French baroque literature Dirk Van der Cruysse, judges: "She was providentially placed between two completely dissimilar brothers, of whom the older made up for the fundamental inability of his younger brother through his appreciation and friendship: to love anyone other than herself. She showed her affection to both of them, wholeheartedly and without any ulterior motives, and accepted the overwhelming power of the one as well as the Italian inclinations of the other without complaint, as destined by fate."

Philippe fulfilled his marital duties rather reluctantly; he wished not to be embraced by Liselotte if possible and even scolded her when she accidentally touched him in his sleep. After fathering three children with his new wife, in 1676 he finally ended their sexual relationship, to Liselotte's own relief.

=== At the court of Louis XIV ===
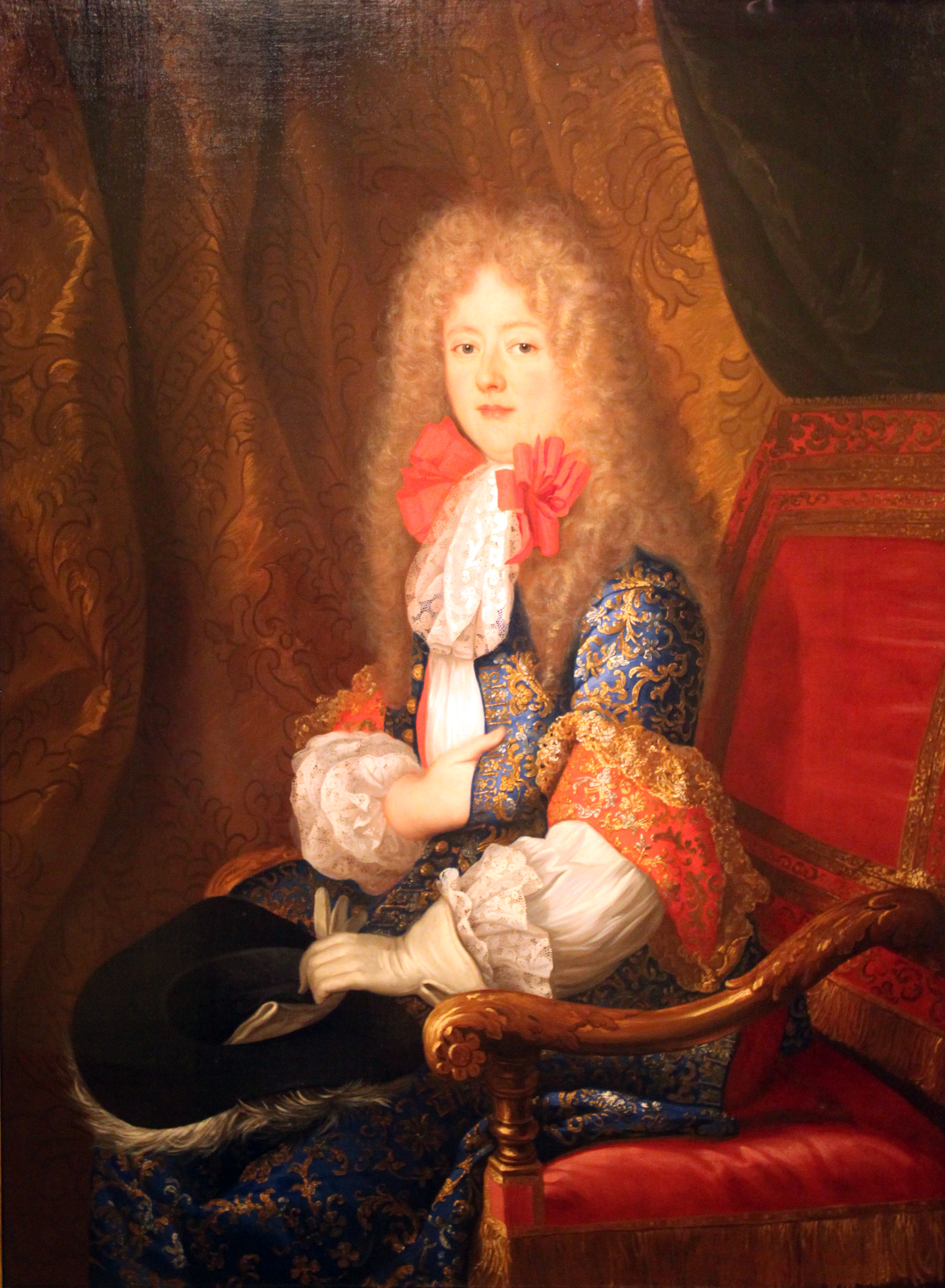
Elizabeth Charlotte, Duchesse d'Orléans, in hunting dress, by Elle the Elder, c. 1683; Deutsches Historisches Museum Berlin.

Liselotte became very close to her brother-in-law Louis XIV. He was "...enchanted by the fact that this was an extremely witty and lovely woman, that she danced well...". He was often quite amused by her open, humorous and refreshingly uncomplicated nature. They often went hunting together—a rather unusual occupation for a noble lady of the time. Her habit of going for long walks was also noticed by the French court and was initially mocked (she even went for a walk in the park at night) but the King was delighted: "The King used to say: il n’y a que Vous qui jouissés des beautés de Versailles (you are the only one who enjoys the beauties of Versailles)".

Despite the fact that she was not particularly beautiful (considered an important asset at French court) and was somewhat unconventional in manners, Liselotte made a good impression on the courtiers. Originally they expected a 'rough' and 'uncultivated' foreigner. Madame de Sévigné remarked "What a delight to have a woman again who can't speak French!", in reference to Queen Maria Theresa, who had never really learned to speak French and was sensitive to the teasing and jokes of the Précieuses. Later, however, the marquise praised Liselotte's "charming directness" and said: "I was amazed at her jokes, not at her lovable jokes, but of her common sense (esprit de bon sens)...I assure you that it cannot be expressed better. She is a very idiosyncratic person, very determined and certainly has taste." Madame de La Fayette was also surprised by and made similar comments about Liselotte's esprit de bon sens. When the Electress Sophia and her daughter visited Liselotte in Paris and Versailles in 1679, she stated: "Liselotte...lives very freely, and with more innocence: her cheerfulness cheers up the King. I have not noticed that her power goes further than making him laugh, nor that she tries to carry it further."

In France, Liselotte only had two German relatives, two older aunts, with whom she had regular contact: Louise Hollandine of the Palatinate (a sister of her father and Abbess of Maubuisson since 1664) and Princess Emilie of Hesse-Kassel (a sister of her mother, who had married the Huguenot general Henri Charles de La Trémoille, Prince of Taranto and Talmont).

=== Difficulties and tragedies ===
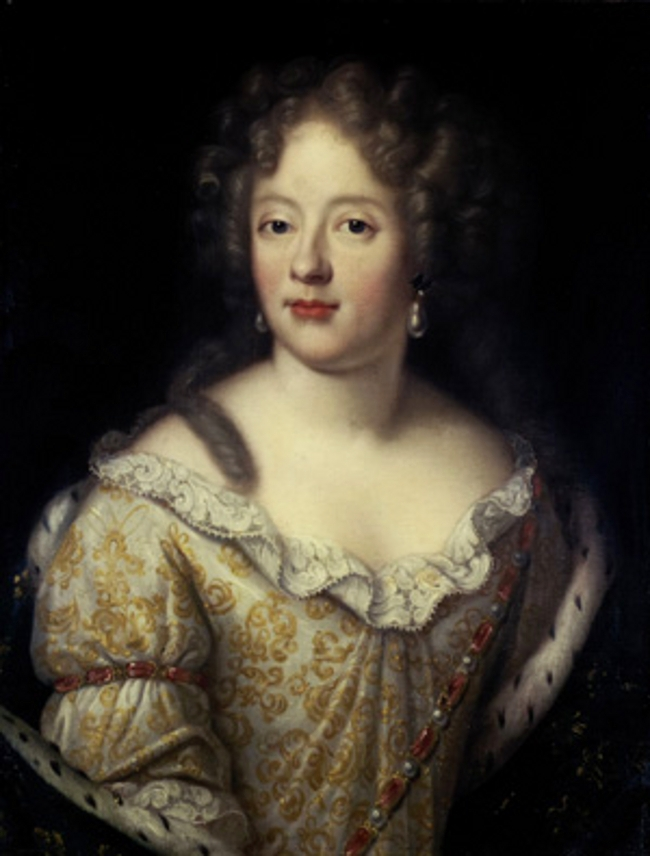
Elisabeth Charlotte, Duchesse d'Orléans, by Pierre Mignard, 1678.

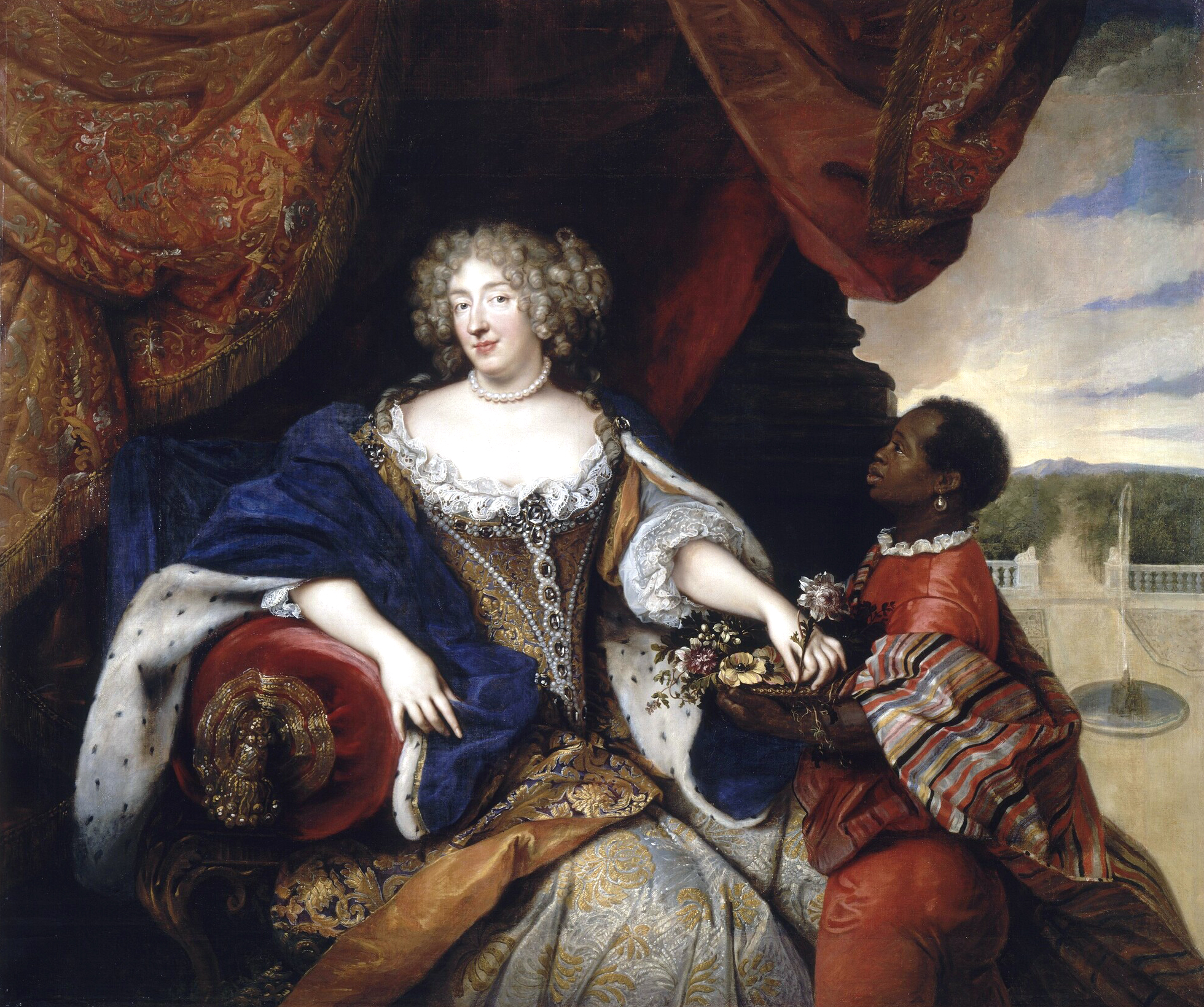
Elisabeth Charlotte, Duchesse d'Orléans, with a moorish page, by François de Troy, 1680.

From around 1680 massive problems arose in the Orléans marriage, as the Chevalier de Lorraine, the Marquis d'Effiat and other favorites of her husband intrigued against Liselotte in order to eliminate her influence on the Duke. Among other things, her enemies conspired to have her confidantes, including her beloved lady-in-waiting Lydie de Théobon-Beuvron and her husband, the Chamberlain Count de Beuvron, dismissed from court. After these departures she was defenseless against the intrigues of the favorites and the arbitrary whims of her husband. To make matters worse, her personal relationship with the King had cooled as his mistress Madame de Maintenon gained influence, leading Louis XIV to be less and less inclined to intervene in Liselotte's quarrels with his brother. Liselotte became isolated, withdrawing more and more into her writing room.

Monsieur...has nothing in the world on his mind but his young boys to eat and drink with them all nights and gives them unheard-of sums of money, nothing costs him nor is too expensive in front of his boys; meanwhile, his children and I hardly have what we need.

— Liselotte von der Pfalz: Letter to Duchess Sophia of Hanover from 7 March 1696.

Simultaneously, Liselotte was drawn into a larger court scandal through her wardship of Comte of Vermandois, whose mother had left court to become a nun. The young comte had become embroiled in a secret homosexual 'brotherhood' of French nobles and courtiers, which required members to "swear an oath to renounce all women." Several incidents were reported in which women were sadistically tortured, and also was reported that a poor waffle seller was raped, castrated and killed by courtiers. Though the Duke of Orléans didn't belong to this brotherhood himself, many of his favorites did. In June 1682, it became known that the 'brotherhood' included the Prince of la Roche-sur-Yon and the young Comte of Vermandois, among other notable figures at court. Louis XIV punished his own son severely and sent him to war, where he died shortly afterwards at the age of 16. Liselotte later recalled: "The Comte de Vermandois was very good-natured. The poor person loved me as if I were his birth mother...He told me his whole story. He had been horribly seduced." One of his 'seducers' is said to have been the Chevalier de Lorraine—her husband's lover and her avowed enemy.

Other problems arose in the following years due to quarrels with Madame de Maintenon, the last important mistress and, from the end of 1683, the secret wife of Louis XIV. Liselotte regarded the marquise with contempt due to her low social rank and her perceived lust for power. She described her in numerous letters with epithets like "the King's old drab", "old whore", "old witch", "Megaera", "Pantocrat" or as "mouse filth mixed with the peppercorns". At the instigation of the increasingly powerful Maintenon, contact between Liselotte and her brother-in-law was restricted to formal occasions, and if the King retired to his private apartments with some chosen relatives after dinner, she was no longer admitted. In 1686, she wrote to her aunt Sophia: "Where the devil can't get there, he sends an old woman, whom we all want to find out, being part of the royal family..." Since Liselotte's correspondence was secretly monitored, the King and the Maintenon were privy to her insults, which further degraded her relationship with the King.

In addition, since 1680 —after the Affair of the Poisons, in which the previous maîtresse-en-titre Madame de Montespan was involved— Louis XIV, under the influence of the bigoted Madame de Maintenon, underwent a transformation from a philanderer who was primarily interested in his pleasure and not infrequently crept into the apartments of Liselotte's maid of honor, into a man obsessed with morality, piety and religion. In 1685, he issued the Edict of Fontainebleau, which ended the religious tolerance of the Edict of Nantes and renewed persecution of Protestants, in France known as Huguenots. Many French Protestants emigrated to Holland and Germany, including Liselotte's aunt, Emilie of Hesse-Kassel. The emigrants were supported by the Brandenburg ambassador, Ezekiel Spanheim, to whom Liselotte was very close because he had once been the tutor of both her father and brother. Since Liselotte herself was originally a Protestant and (in contrast to the half-Huguenot Maintenon) had only become a half-hearted Catholic, this became an important part of her problematic situation. She blamed the situation on the influence of Madame de Maintenon, who she regarded as hypocritically bigoted, corrupt and greedy for power:

The King...didn't know a word about our Bible; he had never been allowed to read it; said that if he only listened to his confessor and talked about his Pater Noster, everything would be fine and he would be completely godly; I often complained about it, because his intention has always been sincere and good. But he was made to believe, the old witch and the Jesuits, that if he would plague the Reformed, that would replace the scandal with God and people, as he did with the double adultery he committed with the Montespan. That's how you betrayed the poor gentleman. I have often told these priests my opinion about it. Two of my confessors, pére Jourdan and pére de St. Pierre, agreed with me; so there were no disputes.

— Liselotte von der Pfalz: Letter to her half-sister Raugräfin Luise from 9 July 1719.

At the royal court, however, the topic was taboo:

EL [her lover] are right to say that one does not talk about the agony here if one does the poor Reformed, one does not hear a single word about it. On what EL say about this, EL can surely think that I am not allowed to say anything, but the thoughts are duty-free; but i have to say that whatever IM (Her Majesty) may be saying on this, don't believe anything if it's mad. The Maintenon, nor does the Archbishop of Paris say; only the King believes in them in religious matters.

— Liselotte von der Pfalz: Letter to Duchess Sophia of Hanover from 10 October 1699.

Liselotte, however, also saw the opportunities that the Huguenots brought to Protestant countries after emigrating:

The poor Reformed ... who settled in Germany will make the French common. Colbert is said to have said that many are subjects of king's and prince's wealth, therefore wanted everyone to marry and have children: so these new subjects of the German electors and princes will become wealthy.

— Liselotte von der Pfalz: Letter to Duchess Sophia of Hanover from 23 September 1699.

When the Wittelsbach line of Palatinate-Simmern ended in 1685 with the death of Liselotte's brother, Charles II, Elector Palatine, Louis XIV raised a claim to the Electoral Palatinate on behalf of Liselotte, contrary to her marriage contract, and began the Palatinate War of Succession. Heidelberg (including the electoral palace) and Mannheim, were systematically destroyed. The experience was extremely traumatic for Liselotte: the death of her beloved half-brother Karllutz and the devastation of her homeland by her brother-in-law in her own name.

...as soon as I had recovered a little from poor Karllutz's death, the terrible and pathetic misery in the poor Palatinate began, and what hurts me most about it is that my name is used to plunge poor people into utter misfortune...So I can not help but regret and weep that, so to speak, I am the downfall of my homeland...

— Liselotte von der Pfalz: Letter to Duchess Sophia of Hanover from 20 March 1689.

This situation inevitably brought her into serious conflict with the King and his inner circle. Her husband Philippe generously distributed the spoils of war that befell him (the so-called Orléans money) to his favorites, in particular to the Chevalier de Lorraine.

In 1692, Liselotte learned that her powerlessness extended even to her own children when Louis XIV married her son Philippe, Duke of Chartres, to Françoise Marie de Bourbon, legitimized daughter of the King and his mistress Madame de Montespan. The King's other "bastards from double adultery" also married within the extended royal family, as their status as illegitimate barred them from marrying into foreign courts and even into other noble families in France, yet the King refused to have them marry below their "station". Liselotte and the courtiers viewed this marriage as a mésalliance and a humiliation, and she reacted with indignation and anger. Various chroniclers report that she was no longer in control of her emotions, and burst into tears of desperation in front of the whole court.Saint-Simon writes that she slapped her son in front of the whole court for consenting to the marriage. The wedding took place on 18 February 1692. The King gave his daughter a pension of 50,000 écus and jewelry worth 200,000 écus, and a two million dowry was promised in the marriage contract, which, in the end, was never paid. The marriage was not a happy one, and Philippe would have affairs throughout his entire life.

In 1693, Elisabeth Charlotte fell ill with life-threatening smallpox. She defied the instructions of contemporary doctors and managed to survive the disease, but ended up with a pockmarked face. She did not concern herself with this, since she had always considered herself ugly (in excessive exaggeration, as earlier portraits by Mignard and Largillière, among others, prove) and had no interest in make-up. Possibly as a further consequence of the disease, from 1694 onwards she gained so much weight, that it began to interfere with her walks. Even so, she continued to hunt, but only with horses that were big and strong enough to support her weight. The external change in her appearance is clearly documented in the surviving portraits from this period.

In September 1700 she complained to her aunt Sophia: "Being a Madame is a great craft, I would have sold it like the batches here in the country, I would have long since carried it for sale". Sophia, who grew up in relatively modest circumstances in exile in Holland, commented on her niece's lamentations in a letter to her (rather poor) half-brother Karllutz:

Madame too has her worries, but in the position of being in where she is, she has enough to console herself with.

— Letter from Duchess Sophia of Hanover to her nephew Raugraf Karllutz from 16 August 1687.

When Sophia was declared heir to the British throne in the spring of 1701 by the Act of Settlement, Liselotte (who would have had a better claim had she not become Catholic) commented on 15 May in a letter to her half-sister Raugräfin Luise: "I would rather be elector than king in England. The English humor and their parliament are not my business, my aunt is better than me; she will also know how to deal with them better than I would have done".

=== Widowhood ===
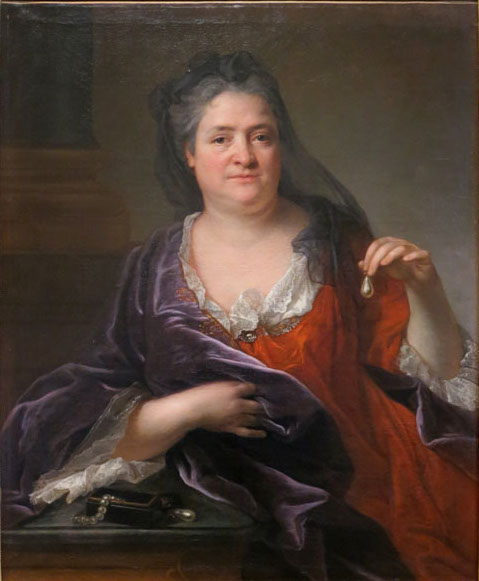
Elisabeth Charlotte, Duchesse d'Orléans, by André Bouys, 1700.

On 9 June 1701, the Duke of Orléans died of a stroke at the Château de Saint-Cloud. Earlier, he had a heated argument with his brother at the Château de Marly about the conduct of his son—who was also Louis XIV's son-in-law. He left only debts, and Liselotte wisely renounced their common property. In his will, which was published publicly in the Mercure galant and the Gazette d’Amsterdam, he did not mention his wife. Liselotte personally burned the love letters he had exchanged with his lovers so that they would not fall into the hands of the notaries: "...in the boxes I locked up all the letters the boys wrote to him, and then spent them unread so that it might not come into contact with others". She wrote to her aunt Sophia: "I must confess that I was much more saddened than I am if Monsieur had not done so böße officien (that is, 'bad services') to the King". Her attitude towards the deceased's mignons was no longer prudish, but rather serene: when she was reported in 1702 that the Earl of Albemarle, the close friend and associate of the recently deceased King William III of England, almost died of heartache, she remarked dryly: "We have not seen such friends here with my lord...".

After her husband's death, Liselotte feared that the King would send her to a convent (as stipulated in her marriage contract), leading her to attempt a reconciliation with Madame de Maintenon. To the King, she explained frankly and freely: "If I hadn't loved you, then I would not have hated Madame de Maintenon so much, precisely because I believed she was robbing me of your favor". Madame de Maintenon confronted Liselotte with secretly-made copies of Liselotte's candid letters to correspondents abroad, which were bursting with abuse against Maintenon, and were read with relish in foreign courts. Liselotte was warned to change her attitude towards Madame de Maintenon, but the peace between the two women was fleeting, and Liselotte was "more tolerated than loved." Except on official occasions, she was rarely admitted to the King's inner circle. She was punished with contempt above all by Marie Adélaïde of Savoy, Monsieur's granddaughter from his first marriage and granddaughter-in-law of Louis XIV, who was a spoiled child, but an outspoken favorite of both the monarch and his mistress.

After Monsieur's death, Liselotte lived in his former apartment in Versailles and took part in visits to the court in Marly or Fontainebleau. She was still allowed to take part in the court hunts, in which she and the King no longer rode on horseback, but sat and shot together from a calash. Liselotte avoided the Palais Royal and Saint Cloud until 1715 in order not to be a burden to her son and his wife. She rarely went to her remote widow's residence, Montargis Castle; but she refrained from selling it in case the King should grow tired of her presence at Versailles, which Maintenon endeavored to work towards:

...she does every day (Madame de Maintenon) abrupt to me, have the bowls I want to eat taken away from my nose at the King's table; when I go to her, she looks at me through an axel and says nothing to me or laughs at me with her ladies; The old woman ordered that express, hoping I would get angry and amport myself so that they could say they couldn't live with me and send me to Montargis. But I notice the farce, so just laugh at everything you start and don't complain, don't say a word; but to confess the truth, so I lead a miserable life here, but my game is settled, I let everything go as it goes and amuse myself as best I can, think: the old one is not immortal and everything ends in the world; they won't get me out of here except through death. That makes you despair with evil...

— Liselotte von der Pfalz: Letter to her aunt Sophia of Hanover from 20 September 1708.

=== The Régence and Death ===
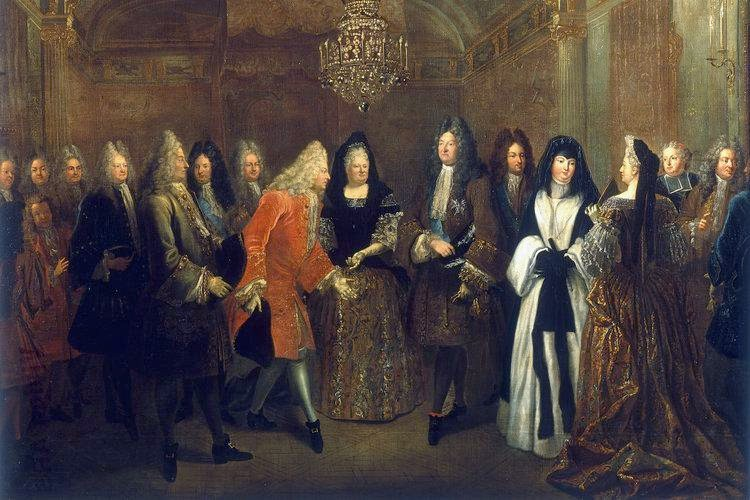
Louis XIV receives the later King of Poland and Elector of Saxony Augustus III, by Louis de Silvestre, 1714. The lady between Augustus (in red) and the King is Liselotte.

Louis XIV died on 1 September 1715 after a reign of 72 years and 110 days; one of the last people he summoned to his deathbed was Liselotte, saying goodbye to her with noble compliments. In his will, the deceased monarch divided the regnal prerogatives among relatives and courtiers, allocating to his legitimized son, the Duke of Maine, guardianship of the new monarch, Louis XV, who was just 5 years old. The Parlement of Paris overturned the will's provisions at the request of Liselotte's son, Philippe II, Duke of Orléans, who, being the only legitimate agnate of the royal family in France, became Regent for the underage sovereign, beginning the time known as the Régence. Liselotte became the first lady of the court; as she had been at least officially once before, between the death of Maria Anna Victoria of Bavaria, Dauphine of France (20 April 1690) and the marriage of Marie Adélaïde of Savoy with Louis, Duke of Burgundy (7 December 1697).

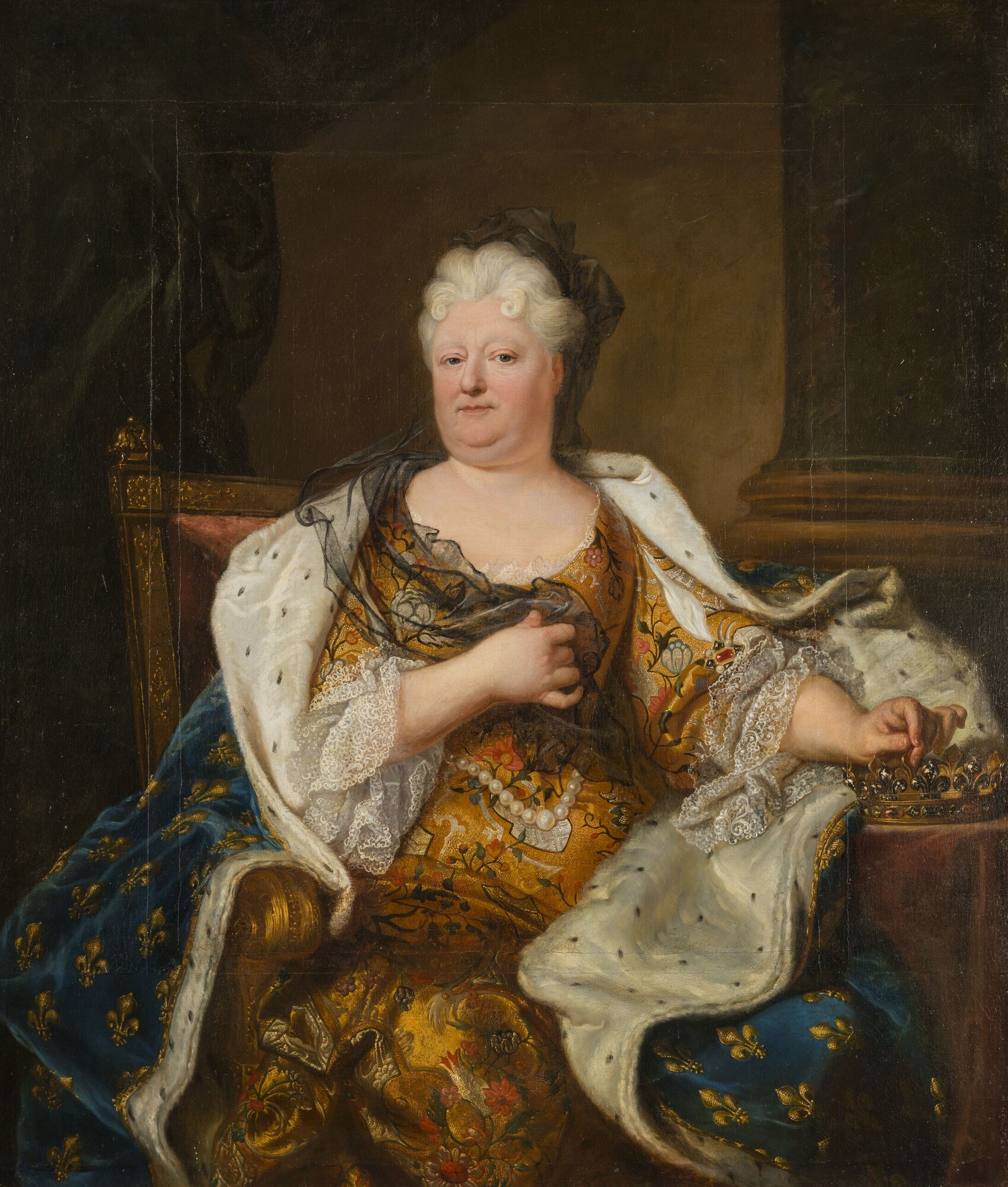
Portrait by Hyacinthe Rigaud, 1713.

The court at Versailles dissolved until the new King came of age, as the late Louis XIV had ordered, and Liselotte was soon able to return to her beloved Saint-Cloud, where she spent seven months of the year from then on, with her old ladies-in-waiting keeping her company: the "Marschallin" Louise-Françoise de Clérambault and the German Eleonore von Venningen (by marriage von Rathsamshausen). She didn't like to spend the winter in the Palais Royal (the official residence of her son and his family) because of the bad Parisian air from the smoke from the many chimneys (and "because in the morning you can only smell empty night chairs and chamber pot") and the bad memories of her marriage:

Unfortunately I have to go back to morose Paris, where I have little rest. But one must do one's duty; I am in the Parisian grace that it would sadden you if I should no longer live there; must therefore sacrifice several months for the good people. They deserve (it) from me, prefer me to their born princes and princesses; they curse you and give me blessings when I drive through town. I also love the Parisians, they are good people. I love it myself that I hate your air and home so much.

— Liselotte von der Pfalz: Letter to her half-sister Raugräfin Luise from 28 November 1720.

Although she had not made it a habit to interfere in politics, only one month after the Louis XIV's death, Liselotte successfully campaigned for the release of Huguenots who had been sent to the galleys for many years because of their beliefs. 184 people, including many preachers, were released; two years later she managed to release a further 30.

Despite her elevation in status, Liselotte did not share in the country's relief after the long rule of Louis XIV; she "was unable to decipher the signs of the times; she saw nothing but the decline and decline of morality, where in reality a new society was born, lively, disrespectful, eager to move and live freely, curious about the joys of the senses and the adventures of the spirit". For example, she strictly refused to receive visitors who were not properly dressed in courtly regalia:

Because the ladies cannot resolve to wear body pieces and to lace up...over time they will pay dearly for their laziness; because compt once again a queen, you will all have to be dressed like before this day, which will be an agony for you; - "You don't know anymore what was farm"...there is no more farm in all of France. The Maintenon invented that first; because, as she saw that the King didn't want to declare her before the queen, she had the young Dauphine (prevented) to hold a court, as keep yourself in your chamber where there is neither rank nor dignity; yes, the princes and the Dauphine had to wait for this lady at her toilet and at the table on the pretext that it was going to be a game.

— Liselotte von der Pfalz: Letter to her half-sister Raugräfin Luise from 23 May 1720.

Most of all, Liselotte was worried about the many intrigues and conspiracies against her son. She loathed the foreign minister and later prime minister, Father Guillaume Dubois (cardinal from 1721) and mistrusted the economist and chief financial controller John Law, who caused a currency devaluation and speculative bubble (the so-called Mississippi bubble):

I wanted this Law to come to Blockula with his art and system and never come to France.

— Liselotte von der Pfalz: Letter to her half-sister Raugräfin Luise from 11 July 1720.

As a clergy advisor, she valued two staunch supporters of the Age of Enlightenment: Archbishop François Fénelon (who fell from grace under Louis XIV) as well as her intermittent confessor Abbé de Saint-Pierre. Etienne de Polier de Bottens, a Huguenot who had followed her from Heidelberg to France, also played a special role as confidante and spiritual advisor. Liselotte, long a marginal figure at court, as the Regent's mother, was suddenly a point of contact for many. However, she by no means appreciated this role change:

...In fact I like to be here (in Saint-Cloud), because I can rest there; in Paris one neither rest nor rest, and if I am to say it in good Palatinate, then I am called too badly to Paris; he brings you a placet, the other plagues you to speak before him (for him); this one demands an audience, the other wants an answer; sum, I can't stand being tormented there, it's worse than never, I drove away again with joy, and one is quite astonished that I am not entirely charmed by these hudleyen, and I confess that I am completely is unbearable...

— Liselotte von der Pfalz: Letter to her half-sister Raugräfin Luise from 19 May 1718.

...what leads me most into the shows, operas and comedies is to do the visits. When I'm not fun, I don't like to speak, and I am at rest in my lies. If I don't like the spectacle, I sleep; sleep is so gentle with the music...

— Liselotte von der Pfalz: Letter to her half-sister Raugräfin Luise from 12 February 1719.

Liselotte was interested in opera and theatre and followed their development over decades, and was also able to recite long passages by heart. She was well read, as evidenced by many of her letters, and had a library of more than 3,000 volumes, including all the popular French and German novels and plays of her time (Voltaire dedicated his tragedy Oedipe to her), as well as most of the classical Greek and Latin authors (in German and French translation), Luther Bibles, maps with copperplate engravings, travelogues from all over the world as well as the tomes of natural history, medicine and mathematics. She amassed an extensive coin collection, primarily of antique gold coins (it was not her father who inherited the 12,000 copies her father had inherited in Kassel, but her mother), she owned 30 books on coin science and corresponded with Spanheim and other numismatists. She also bought three of the recently invented microscopes, with which she examined insects and other things. She spent her days at court gatherings, writing letters, reading and researching.

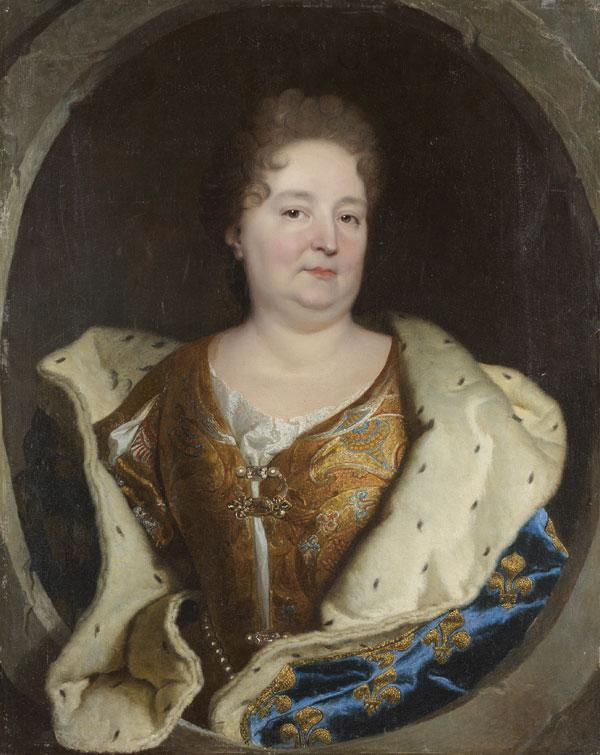
Elisabeth Charlotte, Duchesse d'Orléans. Posthumous portrait from the workshop of Hyacinthe Rigaud, 1723.

In June 1722, she visited Versailles for the last time, when the 12-year-old Louis XV received his 4-year-old bride Infanta Mariana Victoria of Spain. Upon seeing the room in which Louis XIV died, she came to tears:

So I must admit that I cannot get used to seeing nothing but children everywhere and nowhere the great king whom I loved so dearly.

— Liselotte von der Pfalz: Letter to Christian Friedrich von Harling from 4 July 1722.

Elisabeth Charlotte of the Palatinate, Duchess of Orléans, died on 8 December 1722 at 3:30 a.m. at the Château de Saint-Cloud, aged 70. She was buried in the royal necropolis at the Basilica of Saint-Denis, next to her husband. Her son mourned her deeply (only a year later he followed her to the grave), and did not take part in the memorial mass on 18 March 1723. In the funeral sermon she was described as follows:

...I don't know anyone who was so proud and generous and yet by no means haughty; I don't know anyone who was so engaging and amiable and yet by no means slack and powerless; a special mixture of Germanic size and French sociability made itself known, demanded admiration. Everything about her was dignity, but graceful dignity. Everything natural, unsophisticated and not practiced. She felt what she was and she let the others feel it. But she felt it without arrogance and let the others feel it without contempt.

In his memoirs, Saint-Simon describes her:

...strong, courageous, German through and through, open and downright, good and charitable, noble and great in all her demeanor, but extremely petty as to the respect she deserves...

== Correspondence ==
Liselotte is said to have written an estimated 60,000 letters throughout her life, 2/3 in German and 1/3 in French, of which about 5,000 have survived, and about 850 of these are in French. With this, she surpasses the second great letter writer and contemporary witness of her epoch, Madame de Sévigné with her approximately 1,200 letters.

The letters deal with all aspects of life. They contain vivid and often satirical descriptions of court life, memories of her childhood and youth in Germany, the latest court gossip from all over Europe, reflections on literature and theatre, and thoughts about God and the world. Liselotte sought relief by writing long letters to her relatives in Germany, and the constant exchange became a cure for her inner melancholy and sadness. The letters were also a way of maintaining her German, the language being an important link to her home and cultural identity.

Her German letters were mixed with numerous words and passages in French, especially when she was relaying conversations with Louis XIV, with her husband Philippe or other French members of court. Johannes Kramer describes her letters as "the best studied example of the use of the German language in private letters between members of the high nobility". Liselotte tended to use coarse formulations, which was not uncommon in letters from princely persons of the 16th and 17th centuries, but in Helmuth Kiesel's view she had gone extraordinarily far in this, being psychological in disposition and frivolous in tone. Perhaps her previously reformed faith had contributed to the polemics known to her; in any case, their tone differed greatly from the Précieuses of the Parisian salons of their time, and also from the naturalness of the German bourgeois lettering style of the 18th century, as shaped by Christian Fürchtegott Gellert. She liked to draw striking comparisons and often incorporated proverbs or appropriate excerpts from plays. Her favorite saying (and personal motto) is often quoted as: "What cannot be changed, let go as it goes" (Was nicht zu ändern stehet, laß gehen wie es gehet)

Unlike Madame de Sévigné, she did not write for the public, but only as direct communication to her correspondents. This may explain the almost unbridled spontaneity and unrestricted intimacy of her style. The letters often appear to have no pretensions and are subject to spontaneous ideas, whereby they make the reader a living companion (W. L. Holland).

Most of the letters are addressed to her aunt Sophia of the Palatinate, Electress of Hanover, whom she wrote twice a week. Sophia's strong personality offered her support in difficult life situations; Liselotte had also shaped the atmosphere of the Hanoverian court with her scientific and literary interest, her religious tolerance and her thoughts on morality and virtue in consideration of human inadequacies. After Sophia's death in 1714 she complains:

This dear Electress was all my consolation in all the disparaging things, when it happened to me so often; whom my loved ones complained and wrote against received from them, I was consoled against utterly.

— Liselotte von der Pfalz: Letter to her half-sister Raugräfin Luise from 14 July 1714.

Sophia, however, who had been of a cooler and more calculating nature than her emotional niece, had commented on her letters:

Madame may write a long brief, but there is not usually a lot of importance written in it...

— Letter from Duchess Sophia of Hanover to her niece Raugräfin Caroline from 16 August 1687.

Liselotte's half-sister Raugräfin Luise (1661–1733) subsequently became an inadequate replacement for the revered and admired aunt. She had also written regularly to another half-sister, Raugräfin Amalie Elisabeth (Ameliese; 1663–1709). She kept a lifelong contact with her Hanoverian educator Anna Katharina von Offen, the governess of the Electress Sophia's children, and with her husband, the chief stable master Christian Friedrich von Harling.

Her weekly [French] letters to her daughter, the Duchess of Lorraine were destroyed in a fire on 4 January 1719 at the Château de Lunéville, the country residence of the Dukes of Lorraine. In later years, the wife of the British heir to the throne and later King George II, Caroline of Ansbach, also became an important correspondent, although they never met. Caroline was an orphan who had become a ward of Electress Sophia's daughter Sophia Charlotte of Hanover and was married by Sophia to her grandson George in 1705. From her, Liselotte learned all the details about the family quarrels at the English court. She also wrote regularly with the sister of George II and granddaughter of the Electress Sophia, the Prussian Queen Sophia Dorothea of Hanover. Numerous letters to other relatives and acquaintances have also been found, including to Anthony Ulrich, Duke of Brunswick-Wolfenbüttel and his librarian Gottfried Wilhelm Leibniz, who had previously been in the service of Sophia and her husband.

She knew that the Cabinet noir opened her letters to copy critical passages and translate them; hence, she sometimes even incorporated derisive remarks addressed directly to the government, particularly to her favorite enemy, Foreign Secretary Jean-Baptiste Colbert, Marquess of Torcy. Her most frank letters are those which she did not send by post, but gave to travellers en route to Germany. In these letters she was able to freely express her frustrations with Monsieur's favorites in the Palais Royal and her hatred for Madame de Maintenon.

She describes her stylistic principles in a letter to her half-sister Ameliese:

Just continue, always naturally and without writing abruptly! Because I can't take compliments at all. God wish you could write me something that could make me laugh!...The stupidest people in the world can write a compliment, but talking about everything and having a coulant style is rarer than you think...

— Liselotte von der Pfalz: Letter to her half-sister Raugräfin Ameliese from 6 February 1699.

In her letters, Liselotte also mentioned her dislike for the pompous Baroque style that had become fashionable:

I think everything in Germany has changed so much while I've been in France that it feels like another world. I've seen letters...so I struggle to understand. In my day it was thought to be written when the phrases were briefly understood and you said much in a few words, but now you think it's nice when you put a lot of words around them that mean nothing. I do not care, but thank God all those with whom I correspond have not accepted this disgusting fashion; I could not have answered...

— Liselotte von der Pfalz: Letter to Christian Friedrich von Harling from 22 June 1721.

To characterize the nature of her correspondence, she uses the term "chat". The letters usually consisted of 15 to 30 folded sheets of paper with gilt edging, which she inscribed with large, energetic handwriting. Her biographer Dirk Van der Cruysse says: "Had Madame lived in our time, she would have spent her days on the phone". Her letters provide us with a unique perspective on court life in the Baroque period and a vivid picture of her personality. Her descriptions of other members of court are often less precise, but much more colorful and humorous than those of Marquis de Dangeau, whose court diary and memoirs made him the official chronicler of the reign of Louis XIV. Nevertheless, she wrote without literary ambitions and not for posterity either: "I write as I speak; because I am too natural to think before I write." After answering a letter, she burned the letter she had received herself, and probably assumed that the same thing happened to her letters after being read. Fortunately, just under a tenth escaped this fate.

== Nature and appearance ==
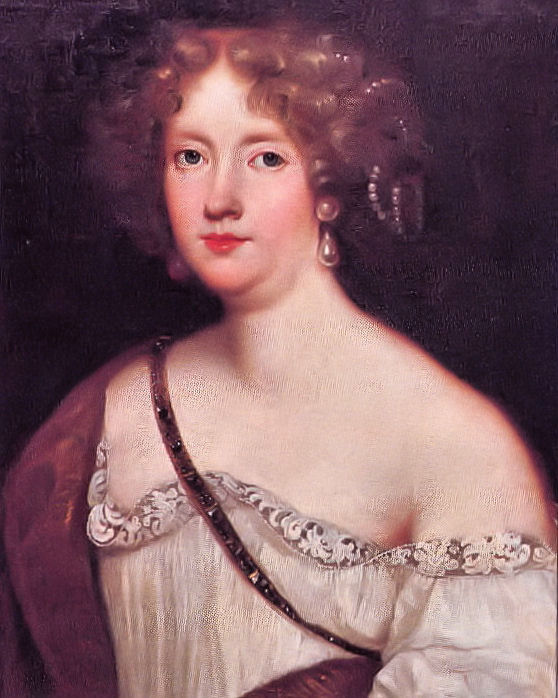
Pierre Mignard, 1677

Liselotte was described as solid and mannish. She possessed the stamina to hunt all day, refusing to wear the mask that Frenchwomen were accustomed to wearing to protect their skin while outdoors. As a result, her face developed a ruddy and weather-beaten look. She walked rapidly, and most courtiers were unable to keep up, save for the King. She had a "no-nonsense" attitude. Her hearty appetite caused her to gain weight as the years went on, and when describing herself she once commented that she would be as good to eat as a roasted suckling pig. Raised as a Protestant, she was not fond of lengthy Latin masses. She remained faithful and was at times outraged by the open infidelity practised by the aristocracy. Her views were frequently the opposite of those prevalent at the French court.

She is known by different names and styles in different languages, either by variations of her given names, such as Charlotte Elisabeth, Elisabeth Charlotte and Liselotte von der Pfalz or variations of her titles and territorial designations, such as Electoral Princess, Princess Palatine, of the Palatinate, of the Rhine, "the Palatine", etc.

The dynastic titles to which she was entitled were Countess Palatine of the Rhine at Simmern and Duchess of Bavaria. At the royal court of France she was known as the Princess Palatine Elisabeth Charlotte prior to her marriage, and afterwards her official title became "Her Royal Highness, Madame, Duchess of Orléans," though she was more widely known simply as Madame, a unique designation she was entitled to as wife of the King's younger brother.

== Quotes ==
- ...I've been ugly in my life, so I couldn't take the pleasure of looking at my bearcat monkey face in the mirror, so it's no wonder that I haven't looked at myself often.
  — Liselotte von der Pfalz: In a letter of 26 October 1704 to her aunt Sophia of Hannover.
- I have not found (my daughter) changed much, but her master (husband) is abhorrent. Before this he was with the most beautiful colors, and now he is completely reddish brown and thicker than my son; I can say that they have children as fat as I am.
  — Liselotte von der Pfalz: Letter of 20 February 1718 to her half-sister Raugräfin Luise.
- ...If it is true that you become a virgin again if you have not slept with a man for long years, then I must have become a virgin again, because since 17 years ago my lord and I did not sleep with each other, but we liked each other, knowing it will not fall into the hands of the gentlemen Tatars. The Tatars have to hold more of the feeling than of the face in the 5 senses because they prefer old women to young women...
  — Liselotte von der Pfalz: In a letter of 15 May 1695 to her aunt Sophia of Hannover.
- ... How I (as a child) in the Hague with IL (my beloved, what is meant is the later English King William III of England) and met verlöff met verlöff —in Low German: "mit Verlaub" (with all due respect)— in mein hembt schiß (shat in my shirt), I thought he would become in such a great figure one day; if only his big hits are not sealed like I sealed our games back then; but if it were to happen and peace would come about as a result, I would really want to be satisfied...
  — Liselotte von der Pfalz: In a letter of 8 October 1688 to her aunt Sophia of Hannover, when William of Orange was preparing to overthrow his pro-French father-in-law, King James II of England.
- ...for it has been known to me all my life to be a woman, and to be Elector, forbid me to tell the truth, better to be aware than to be Madame; but if god's sake didn't know, it is unnecessary to bear in mind...
  — Liselotte von der Pfalz: In a letter from 15 May 1701.
- I would prefer to be a rich ruling imperial count with his freedom, rather than a fils de France (royal prince of France), for we are nothing but crowned slaves; I would be suffocated if I hadn't said this...
  — Liselotte von der Pfalz: In a letter of 17 August 1710 to her aunt Sophia of Hannover.
- ...that makes me bleed heartily, and if you still think I'm sick that I'm sad about it...
  — Liselotte von der Pfalz: In a letter of 10 November 1688 to her aunt Sophia of Hannover about the destruction of Mannheim by the French army.
- ...I believe that M. de Louvois burns in hell because of the Palatinate; he was terribly cruel, nothing could complain...
  — Liselotte von der Pfalz: In a letter of 28 January 1708 to her aunt Sophia of Hannover about the French Secretary of State for War, Marquis de Louvois.
- As EL now describe the German court to me, I would find a big change in it; I think more of sincerity than of magnificence, and I am quite happy to hear that such is lost in homeland. It is easy to see what the luxe chases away the good-heartedness from; you cannot be magnificent without money, and if you ask so much about money you become interested, and once you become interested you seek out all the means to get something, which then breaks down falsehood, lies and deceit, which then faith and sincerity quite chased away.
  — Liselotte von der Pfalz: In a letter of 1 May 1692 to her aunt Sophia of Hanover.
- I have no ambition, I don't want to rule anything, I wouldn't find any pleasure in it. This is some (own) thing for French women; no kitchen maid here believes that she has insufficient understanding to rule the whole kingdom and that she is being done the greatest injustice in the world not to consult her. All of that made me feel very sorry about ambition; for I find such a hideous ridicul in this that I dread it.
  — Liselotte von der Pfalz: In a letter of 9 July 1719 to her half-sister Raugräfin Luise.
- ...there are a lot of royal persons, if one has been brought up badly and spoiled in youth, only learned their grandeur for them, but not because they are only people like others and cannot be valued with all their grandeur, if they have no good temper and strive for virtue. I once read in a book that they are compared to pigs with gold collars. That struck me and made me laugh, but that's not bad...
  — Liselotte von der Pfalz: In a letter of 19 November 1719 to her half-sister Raugräfin Luise.
- I cannot live without doing nothing; I can still go crazy without chatting at all times would be unbearable for me...I can't read all the time either, my brain is too confused ... writing amuses me and gives my sad thoughts distraction. So I will not break off any of my correspondence, and whatever you may say, dear Luise, I will write to you all on Thursdays and Saturdays and to my dear Princess of Wales all Tuesday and Friday. I love writing; for me is a real pleasure to read and answer writing; that diverts me more than the spectacular...My smallest letter, as I write in the whole week, is to the Queen of Spain...and it gives me more trouble than any other letter ... I stay than compliments must answer, which I have never been able to take ... It could easily be that the Princess of Wales could be content to have my silly letters only once a week and to write only once; but that doesn't suit me at all, so I'll continue as I've done so far.
  — Liselotte von der Pfalz: In a letter of 13 March 1721 to her half-sister Raugräfin Luise.
- This morning I find out that the old Maintenon died, yesterday evening between 4 and 5 o'clock. It would be very lucky if it happened 30 years ago...
  — Liselotte von der Pfalz: In a letter of 16 April 1719 to her half-sister Raugräfin Luise.
- Believe me, dear Luise! The only difference between the Christian religions is that they are preachers, whatever they may be, Catholic, Reformed or Lutheran, they all have ambitions and all Christians want to make one another hate because of their religion, so that they may be needed and they may rule over people. But true Christians, if God has done the grace to love him and virtue, do not turn to the priesthood, they follow God's word as well as they understand it, and the order of the churches in which they find themselves leave that constraint to the priests, superstitions to the mob and serve their god in their hearts and seek not to give anybody offense. This is as far as God is concerned, on the whole you have no hatred of your negatives, whatever religion he may be, seek to serve him where you can, and surrender entirely to divine providence.
  — Liselotte von der Pfalz: In a letter of 30 June 1718 to her half-sister Raugräfin Luise.
- If one were not persuaded that everything was planned and not to end, one would have to live in constant agony and always think that one had to reproach oneself for something; but as soon as one sees that God Almighty has foreseen everything and nothing history, as what has been ordained by God for so long and at all times, one must be patient in everything and one can be satisfied with oneself at all times, if, what one does, in good opinion history; the rest is not with us.
  — Liselotte von der Pfalz: In a letter of 25 June 1695 to her half-sister Raugräfin Luise.

== Legacy ==
In 1788, some longer excerpts from Liselotte's letters appeared for the first time in a French translation, then a few years later in the German original, under the title Anecdotes from the French Court, especially from the times of Louis XIV and the Duke Regent. During the French Revolution, it was believed that Liselotte was a key witness to the depravity and frivolity of the Ancien Régime. This Chronique scandaleuse became popular in Germany when the editors of the letters succeeded in identifying the author as a moral and honest German princess in the midst of the depraved and frivolous French court life. In her aversion to the French way of life and her enthusiasm for everything German (and especially Palatinate), her published letters followed the pattern of anti-French sentiment in German literature of the 17th century.

In 1791, a new, anonymously edited selection of letters appeared under the title "Confessions of Princess Elisabeth Charlotte of Orléans". In this publication, she was portrayed as The good, honest, German woman–without all the pampered and creeping court sensibilities, without all the crookedness and ambiguity of the heart–, representative of the more honest times of earlier centuries, to which the German courts had to return in order to prevent revolution. The Duchess of Orléans thus became a figure of considerable cultural importance in Germany.

Friedrich Karl Julius Schütz published a new selection of the letters in 1820, also emphasizing the "strong contrast between the old, truly German simplicity, loyalty, honesty and efficiency...to the glamour, opulence, etiquette and gallantry, such as the unlimited intriguing spirit and the whole, systematically developed frivolity and hypocrisy of this court, for a full half of a century."

"In the further course of the 19th century, the letters lost their immediate political relevance, but because of their cultural and historical significance and their German usability, they found equally committed editors and a broad public." Wolfgang Menzel, who in 1843 edited a volume of letters addressed to her half-sister Raugräfin Luise, saw in the Duchess of Orléans the simple German woman and the most open soul in the world, who only had to watch too much moral corruption... understandable that she sometimes expresses herself about it in the crudest words. From then on, the letters were widely used as anti-French propaganda by a growing German nationalist movement. Liselotte was stylized as a martyr of the French court and elevated into a national cult figure, by figures such as Paul Heyse, Theodor Schott and Eduard Bodemann.

== Children ==
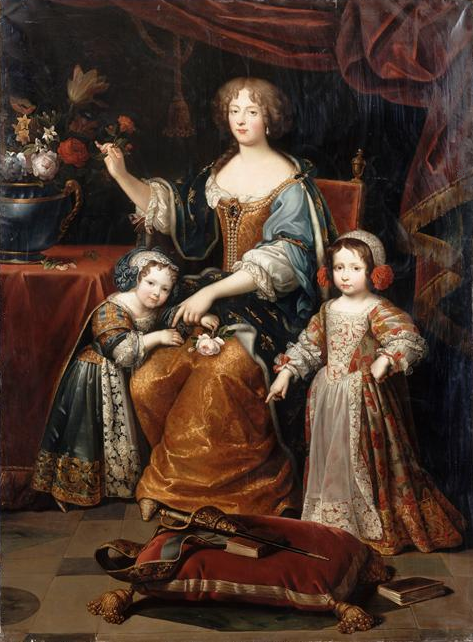
Elisabeth Charlotte, Duchesse d'Orléans with her two surviving children. Copy by Jean-Gilbert Murat (1837) after an original by Pierre Mignard from ca. 1678–1679.

Liselotte and Philippe I of Orléans had three children together:

- Alexandre Louis d'Orléans, Duke of Valois (2 June 1673 – 16 March 1676). Born at the Château de Saint-Cloud and died at the Palais-Royal before his third birthday. His death has been attributed to bloodletting by the Orléans family's doctors; last person to carry the title Duke of Valois.
- Philippe d'Orléans (2 August 1674 – 2 December 1723). Born at the Château de Saint-Cloud, he was titled Duke of Chartres from birth until becoming Duke of Orléans in 1701; married his first cousin Françoise Marie de Bourbon and had issue; died at the Palace of Versailles; Regent of France and Navarre during the minority of Louis XV — the era was known as la Régence.
- Élisabeth Charlotte d'Orléans (13 September 1676 – 23 December 1744). Born at the Château de Saint-Cloud and married Leopold, Duke of Lorraine in 1698 and had issue; became the Sovereign Princess of Commercy 1737; she died at Commercy; known as Mademoiselle de Chartres, a title given her at birth; grandmother of Queen Marie Antoinette.

Liselotte had a warm relationship with her children. She was devastated by the untimely death of her eldest son Alexandre Louis at the age of two. She mourned him for six months before the birth of her daughter, who apparently helped her over the terrible loss.

I don't think one can die from excessive sadness, otherwise I would undoubtedly have died, for what I felt inside is impossible to describe.

— Liselotte von der Pfalz: Letter to Anna Katharina von Offen from April 1676 about the death of her first son.

Her younger son Philippe resembled her in appearance, and also shared her literary, artistic and scientific interests. During his father's lifetime and shortly thereafter, his relationship with his mother was distant under the influence of his father and his favorites, and his mother often criticized his debauchery. Later, however, their relationship improved.

== Fashion ==
The so-called palatine is named after Liselotte; it is a short cape or turned-down collar trimmed with fur, which women use to protect the cleavage and neck from the cold in winter. Originally, she was mocked by the French court because of her "old" furs that she wore when she arrived from Heidelberg, but since she was very popular with the king in the 1670s, the ladies began to imitate this trend during the unusually cold winter of 1676. The result was a womenswear item valued for centuries. When Liselotte wanted to put on her old fur again in November 1718 to see a performance of Voltaire's Oedipus, to which she was dedicated, she found that it had been eaten by clothes moths. But she took the opportunity to examine the moths under the microscope the next day.

== Popular culture ==
- 1932: Liselott - Singspiel by Richard Keßler, music by Eduard Künneke, performed in Heidelberg in 2004–2005.
- 1935: Liselotte von der Pfalz - UFA film, director and screenplay: Carl Froelich, literary source: Rudolf Presber. Liselotte was played by Renate Müller.
- 1943: Liselotte - Ein Roman aus dem Leben der Elisabeth Charlotte von der Pfalz (Liselotte - A novel from the life of Elisabeth Charlotte von der Pfalz). Alexander Freiherr von Ungern-Sternberg, A. Weichert Verlag Berlin
- 1966: Liselotte von der Pfalz - Director: Kurt Hoffmann. Liselotte was played by Heidelinde Weis
- 2014: A Little Chaos - British film, directed by Alan Rickman. Liselotte was played by Paula Paul.
- 2017–2018: Versailles - BBC series. Liselotte was played by Jessica Clark.

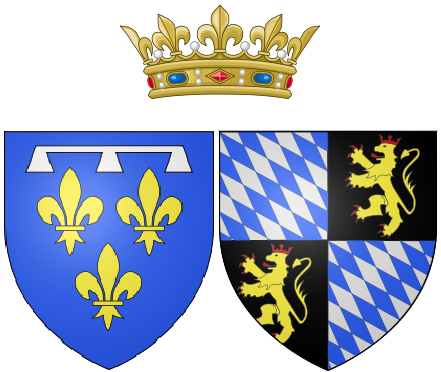
Arms of alliance of Liselotte as Duchess of Orléans (Bourbon-Wittelsbach).

== Titles and styles ==
- 27 May 1652 – 16 November 1671: Her Serene Highness Princess Palatine Elisabeth Charlotte
- 16 November 1671 – 9 June 1701: Her Royal Highness The Duchess of Orléans
- 9 June 1701 – 8 December 1722: Her Royal Highness The Dowager Duchess of Orléans
  - Madame was the prevalent style accorded her from marriage.

== Ancestry ==
Ancestors of Elizabeth Charlotte, Madame Palatine

8. Frederick IV, Elector Palatine
4. Frederick V, Elector Palatine
9. Louise Juliana of Orange-Nassau
2. Charles I Louis, Elector Palatine
10. James I of England and VI of Scotland
5. Elizabeth Stuart
11. Anne of Denmark
1. Élisabeth Charlotte of the Palatinate
12. Maurice, Landgrave of Hesse-Kassel
6. William V, Landgrave of Hesse-Kassel
13. Agnes of Solms-Laubach
3. Charlotte of Hesse-Kassel
14. Philip Louis II, Count of Hanau-Münzenberg
7. Amalie Elisabeth of Hanau-Münzenberg
15. Catharina Belgica of Orange-Nassau
