= Offen =

Offen may refer to:

- Offen, Bergen
- Anna Katharina von Offen (1624-1702) German courtier and royal governess
- Bernard Offen (1929-)
- Helga Offen (1951-2020) German volleyball player
- Ron Offen (1930-2010) American poet
