= Christian Gottfried Schütz =

German classical scholar and humanist

- Born: 19 May 1747; Dederstädt, Electorate of Saxony
- Died: 7 May 1832; Halle, Province of Saxony, Prussia
- Education: University of Halle
- Occupations: Humanist, philosopher, philologist, publisher, editor
- Employer(s): University of Halle, University of Jena
- Spouse: Anna Henriette Danovius (m. 1778; d. 1823)
- Children: 3, including Karl Julius

Christian Gottfried Schütz (19 May 1747 – 7 May 1832) was a German classical scholar and humanist, known for his contributions in philosophy and philology, and for his work as an academic and literary editor and publisher.

== Life ==
Christian Gottfried Schütz was the eldest of eight recorded children born to the Protestant minister Gottfried Schütz and his wife, in the village of Dederstädt, a couple of hours walk to the south of Eisleben, in an area administered, under a slightly convoluted arrangement by Saxony. Shortly after his birth his father was appointed to a senior preaching position in nearby Aschersleben, to where the family relocated, and it was here that the boy received his early schooling. Later he attended the Latin orphanage school in Halle before moving on in 1765 to the Martin Luther University of Halle-Wittenberg where he was taught Theology by Johann Jakob Semler, who talent spotted him and set him on his life's career as an academic. After he had received his Master of Philosophy degree, awarded on 21 March 1768, he took a post teaching mathematics at the Knights' Academy (Ritterakademie) at Brandenburg an der Havel. The next year he was appointed an inspector of Theology Seminaries in Halle, a position that opened the way for him to become a visiting professor in Philosophy at the university in 1775 and a full professor in 1777.

He moved in 1779, taking a post as Professor of "Poetry and eloquence" ("Poesie und Beredsamkeit") at Jena University, where he would play a key role in communicating in the German heartland and, on occasion defending, the new philosophical perspectives of Immanuel Kant. With Christoph Martin Wieland and Friedrich Justin Bertuch, in 1785 Schütz founded the Allgemeine Literatur-Zeitung (daily literary journal) which could boast more than 2,000 subscribers within two years of its launch and continued to be produced, latterly from Halle, till 1849. At Jena he was also one of those involved in administration: during the summer term of 1790 and again in 1798 he served as Rector of the university.

In 1804 Schütz transferred from Jena to Halle, accompanied by his son, Friedrich Karl Julius Schütz who was himself appointed a visiting professor of philosophy at Halle. They were also accompanied by Johann Samuel Ersch, and together they continued with the Allgemeine Literatur-Zeitung (daily literary journal), now in their new home base where a royal donation of 10,000 Gold Thalers had enabled them to acquire the so-called " Semler’schen House" in which the journal could be produced. Christian Gottfried Schütz himself was appointed Professor of the History of Literature and Eloquence.

Political developments in 1806 hit Schütz particularly hard. In October 1806, in the aftermath of the Battle of Jena nearby, Halle was over-run by a victorious French army. Schütz's house was plundered while he himself was arrested and briefly detained by the invading forces. Possibly of greater long term consequence was the French emperor's decision to close down the university and convert its main building into a quarantine hospital. Deprived of his university salary, Schütz was eventually obliged to sell a valuable volume from his library. He considered moving to Berlin, but in the end remained in Halle, redoubling the effort he put into his academic and literary publishing. Above all, the Allgemeine Literatur-Zeitung somehow lived on and flourished. In 1808 Schütz was elected an external member of the Bavarian Academy of Sciences and Humanities. At Halle the university remained closed till December 1814, but the war years ended in 1815 and the university was reinstated, impoverished and for a time diminished, but not terminated: Schütz appears still to have been based at Halle when he died there in 1832.

== Christian Gottfried Schütz output ==
-not a complete list

=== as an author ===
- Opuscula philologica et philosophica Halle 1830

(various treatises).

=== as a publisher-editor ===
- Aeschylus: Works 3rd edition, Halle 1809/22 (5 vols)
- Cicero: Works Leipzig 1814/23 (20 vols)
- Aristophanes: Works Leipzig 1821 (1 vol: subsequent vols unpublished)

Schütz published volumes on a wide range of themes in the areas of philosophy, philology, rhetoric, psychology, education and university matters. He published collections of the writings of Aeschylus, Cicero, und Aristophanes. In respect of philosophy he was particularly influential as one of the first defenders, and then a promoter, of Immanuel Kant, with whom he entered into what became a long running correspondence in 1784. As early as 1768, in a dissertation of his own on Aesthetics, Schütz referenced Kant's 1764 critical work Observations on the Feeling of the Beautiful and Sublime. In 1785 he organised a series of articles in his Allgemeine Literatur-Zeitung focused on Kant's critical philosophy, in which he included contributions of his own that robustly rebutted criticism of it from opponents such as Ernst Platner, Dietrich Tiedemann and Johann Christoph Schwab. He also won for Kant (whose home town of Königsberg was even then considered by some to be somewhat peripheral, intellectually as geographically, to the German cultural heartland) the right to make his own contributions in the Allgemeine Literatur-Zeitung, and entered into discussions with him on the influential "Kritik der reinen Vernunft" "(Critique of Pure Reason)" (1781).

== Personal life ==
Christian Gottfried Schütz married in Halle in 1778. His bride was Anna Henriette Danovius from Danzig. She, like him, was the child of a Protestant minister: she was a daughter of Ludwig Danovius (1711–1771) by his marriage to Anna Eleonora Gerschner. Of the various children born to the Schütz's marriage it is the historian Friedrich Karl Julius Schütz (1779–1844) whose footprints feature most prominently in surviving sources.
