= Friedrich Karl Julius Schütz =

German historian (1779–1844)

Friedrich Karl Julius Schütz (31 May 1779, Halle an der Saale – 4 September 1844, Leipzig) was a German historian. He was the son of philologist Christian Gottfried Schütz (1747–1832).

== Life ==
Karl Julius Schütz studied history at the universities of Jena, Erlangen and Göttingen, obtaining his habilitation in 1801 at Jena. From 1804 onward, he was an associate professor of philosophy at the University of Halle. He was the husband of actress Henriette Hendel-Schütz, with whom he accompanied on her theatrical tours – on occasion he also performed on stage.

== Selected works ==
- Leben und Charakter der Elisabeth Charlotte Herzogin von Orleans, 1820 – Life and character of Élisabeth Charlotte, Duchess of Orléans.
- Goethe und Pustkuchen, 1823 – Goethe and Johann Friedrich Wilhelm Pustkuchen.
- Goethe's Philosophie, 6 volumes 1825–26 – Goethe's philosophy.
- Geschichte der Staatsveränderung in Frankreich unter König Ludwig XVI. oder Entstehung, Fortschritte und Wirkungen der sogenannten neuen Philosophie in diesem Lande, 1827 – History of the change of state in France under Louis XVI.
- Kritik der Ausgabe von Göthe's Werken, 1828 – Review of Goethe's works.
- Müllner's Leben, Charakter und Geist, 1830 – Amandus Gottfried Adolf Müllner's life, character and spirit.
- Leben, Charakter und Kunst des Ritters Nicolo Paganini, 1830 – Life, character and art of Niccolò Paganini.
- Christian Gottfried Schütz, 2 volumes 1834–35 – Biography of his father, Christian Gottfried Schütz.
- Zacharias Werner's Biographie und Characteristik, nebst Original-Mittheilungen aus dessen handschriftlichen Tagebüchern, 2 volumes 1841 – Zacharias Werner's biography and character.
