= Anna Katharina von Offen =

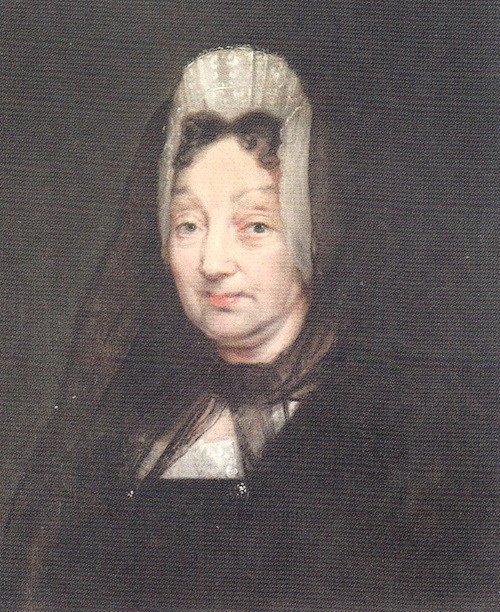
Anna Katharina von Offen

Anna Katharina von Offen (1624–1702), was a German courtier and royal governess. She served as Oberhofmeisterin to Sophia of Hanover, and also served as governess to her children.
